= Bab Segma =

City gate in Morocco

- باب السيكمة
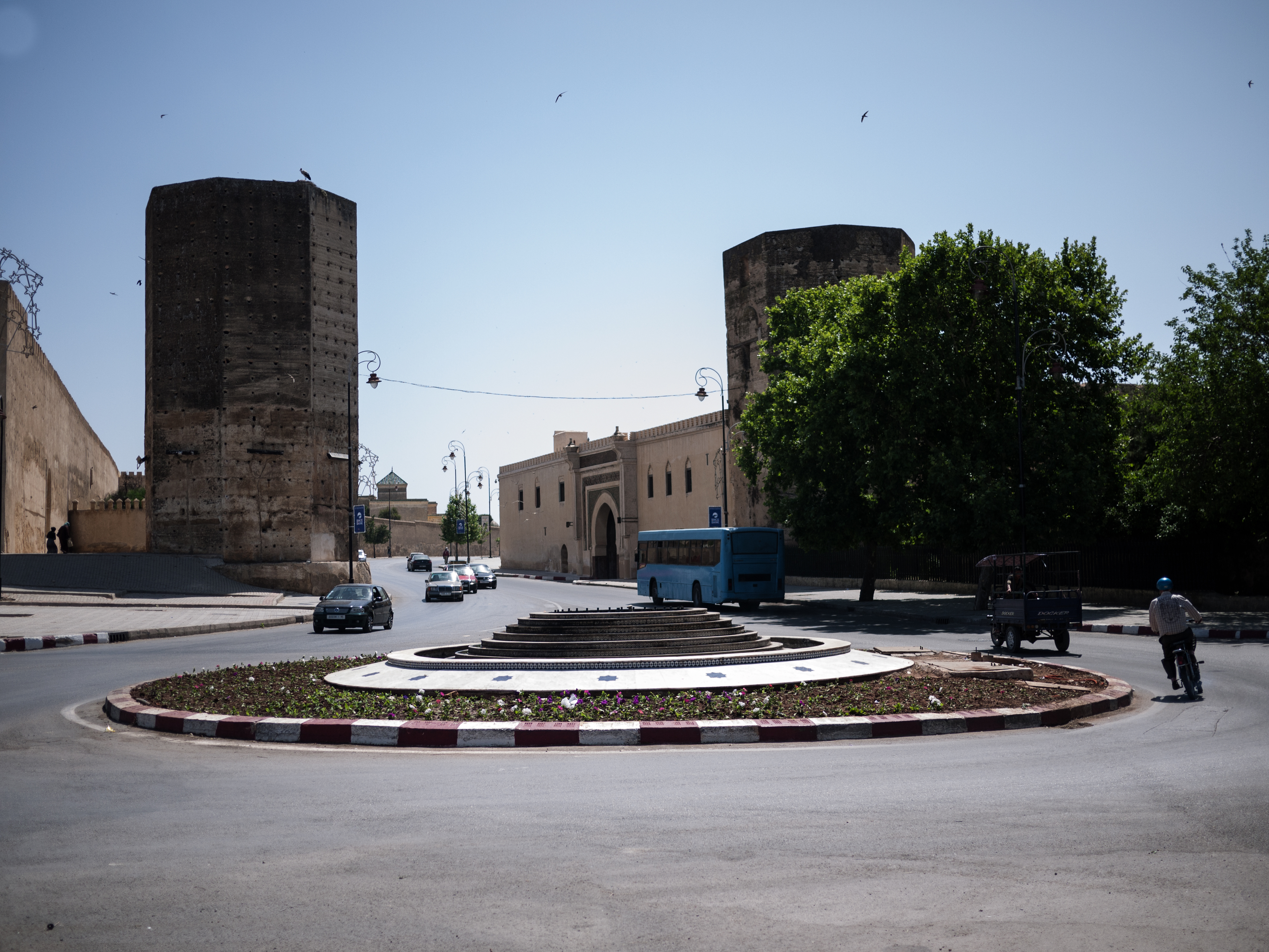
- View of the two massive towers of Bab Segma today, flanking a modern road.
- Interactive map of the Bab Segma area

General information
- Type: city gate
- Architectural style: Marinid, Moorish, Moroccan
- Location: Fez, Morocco
- Coordinates: 34°03′36″N 4°59′33″W
- Completed: circa 1287 CE

Bab Segma (Arabic: باب السيكمة) was a former Marinid gate in Fes, Morocco. It was located north of Fes el-Jdid and was built in 1286 as a part of the Marinid royal gardens located there. The towers of the gate are still visible today and the name of the gate is still used as a toponym in the area.

== History ==
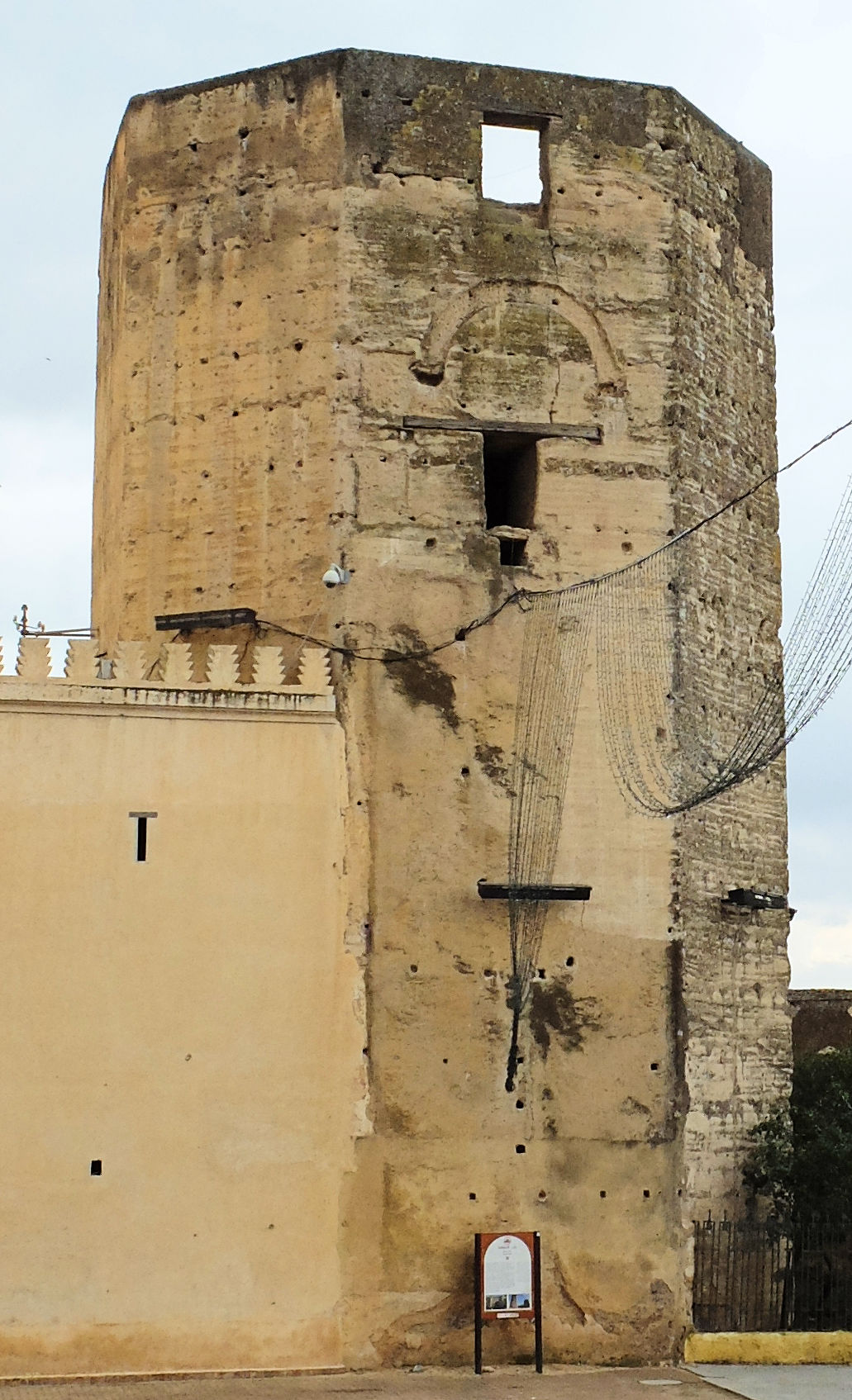
South tower of Bab Segma. The dark rectangular opening in the upper part of the tower is where the water aqueduct for the Mosara Gardens once passed through the tower. The semi-circular outline above this may have been the vaulted roof of a passage running on top of the aqueduct.

This gate was located in the area between what is now the Kasbah Cherarda and the walls of the New Mechouar. It is still marked by two massive octagonal towers dating from the Marinid period (with subsequent remodeling). These two octagonal towers are believed to have been part of an entrance to the Mosara Garden, a vast Marinid royal garden created in 1287 by Abu Ya'qub Yusuf to the north of Fes el-Jdid. The gardens were enclosed by their own walls and were supplied with water via a raised aqueduct that ran between Bab Dekkakin and Bab Segma. The aqueduct passed inside the octagonal towers before turning towards the interior of the gardens; rectangular openings in the mid-upper parts of the towers today show where the aqueduct once passed. The gardens fell into disuse and disappeared after the Marinid period, leaving only the towers of Bab Segma and a few other traces nearby.

In the 17th century the Alaouite sultan Moulay Rashid built the Kasbah Cherarda on the gate's northwest side. It is believed that for a time a covered passage ran on top of the old aqueduct connecting Bab Dekkakin with the Kasbah; the semi-circular outline of a vaulted roof is still visible above the former path of the aqueduct and likely corresponds to this passage.

The name "Bab Segma" later came from a pious woman called Amina Sagma who was buried here in 1737, and has remained as a toponym in the area sometimes applied to the nearby Bab Kbibat es-Smen gate. The latter was built in 1886 as the northern entrance to the New Mechouar; though another source gives its name as Bab Moussiki. The nearby cemetery to the north of Fes el-Jdid is also typically referred to as the "Bab Segma Cemetery".
