= Mosara Garden =

Former royal garden of the Marinids in present-day Fez, Morocco

Coordinates: 34°3′39″N 4°59′55″W

The Mosara Garden or el-Mosara (Arabic: المسارة, romanized: al-Muṣāra) was a vast royal garden to the north of Fes el-Jdid, the historic citadel and palace-city of the Marinid dynasty in Fes, Morocco. The gardens were created by the Marinid sultan Abu Ya'qub Yusuf in 1286 and became famous in part because of a huge noria (waterwheel) that was created to provide it with water. The gardens were abandoned and progressively ruined during the Saadian period (16th-17th centuries) and have since disappeared, leaving only a few traces in what is now the Bab Segma Cemetery as well as the supporting structures for the former noria and the aqueduct it fed.

== Name ==
Historical Arabic sources from the Marinid era called the garden estate Jannat al-Muṣāra or Rawḍ al-Muṣāra. The words jannat and rawḍ designate a "garden". According to scholars Henri Bressolette and Jean Delarozière, the name al-Muṣāra or el-Mosara meant "the marvel", due to the strong impression the gardens made on visitors. According to scholar Iñigo Almela, the name had a different etymology, most likely related to an equestrian space for training or racing horses.

== History ==
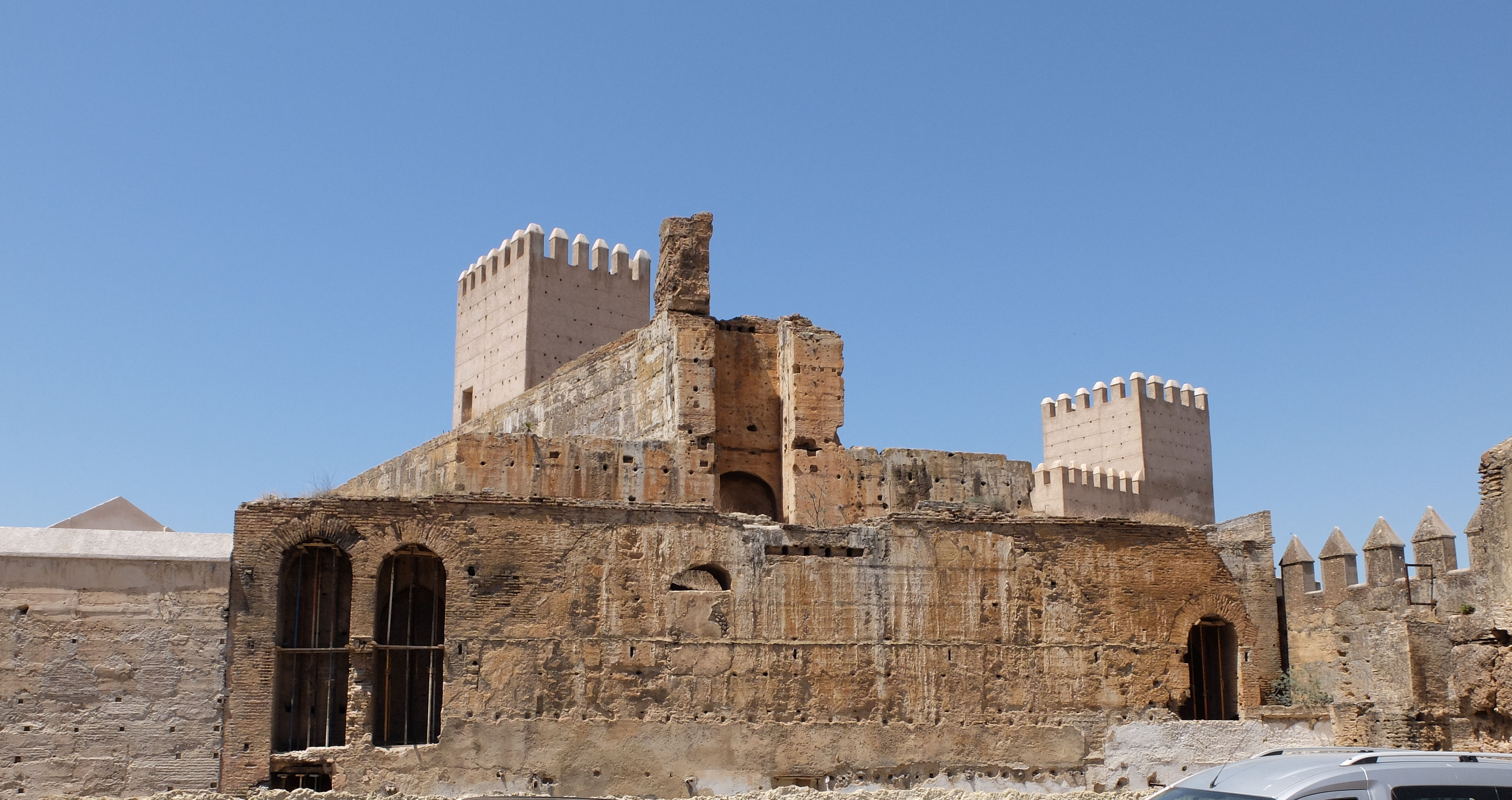
The former waterworks complex on the southwest side of Bab Dekkakin: in the foreground is the structure that housed the enormous noria (waterwheel), no longer extant, that raised water to the aqueduct supplying the gardens. The section of wall rising above the rest in the middle was the beginning of the aqueduct running north. (The crenellated towers in the background are part of Bab Dekkakin.)

Abu Yusuf Ya'qub, who founded Fes el-Jdid ('New Fes') as a new Marinid royal city in 1276, had also wished to create a vast royal pleasure garden, perhaps in emulation of those he might have admired in Granada (such as the Generalife); however, he died in 1286 before this could be accomplished. His son and successor, Abu Ya'qub Yusuf, carried out the work instead in 1287. He enlisted an Andalusi engineer, Ibn al-Hajj from Seville, to help create a vast garden to the north of Fes el-Jdid, along with the water distribution infrastructure required to maintain it. Among these works was a famous and enormous noria which raised water from the Oued Fes (Fes River) up to an aqueduct that then ran north from Bab Dekkakin (originally Bāb al-Sab') to Bab Segma (or Bāb al-Sākima).The huge noria was frequently the subject of commentary by chroniclers and travelers in subsequent centuries.

The gardens fell into ruin and eventually disappeared in subsequent centuries, most likely during the neglect of Fes throughout the Saadian period (16th-17th centuries), but traces of its structures have survived to modern times. The most prominent remains are the octagonal towers of Bab Segma, once the entrance gate to the gardens, but some faint remains of the water basins are also documented. The site of the garden is now mostly occupied by the large Bab Segma Cemetery (probably dating from the time of Moulay Rashid), inside of which the outline of some of the original basins can still be discerned. The noria reportedly disappeared in 1888, leaving only remains of its stone base. Some modern authors sometimes identify the waterwheel on the western edge of the Jnan Sbil Gardens with the remains of the great Marinid noria, but other authors have rebuked this by observing that the Grand Noria would have been far larger and would have been located where the Dar al-Makina currently stands.

== Description ==
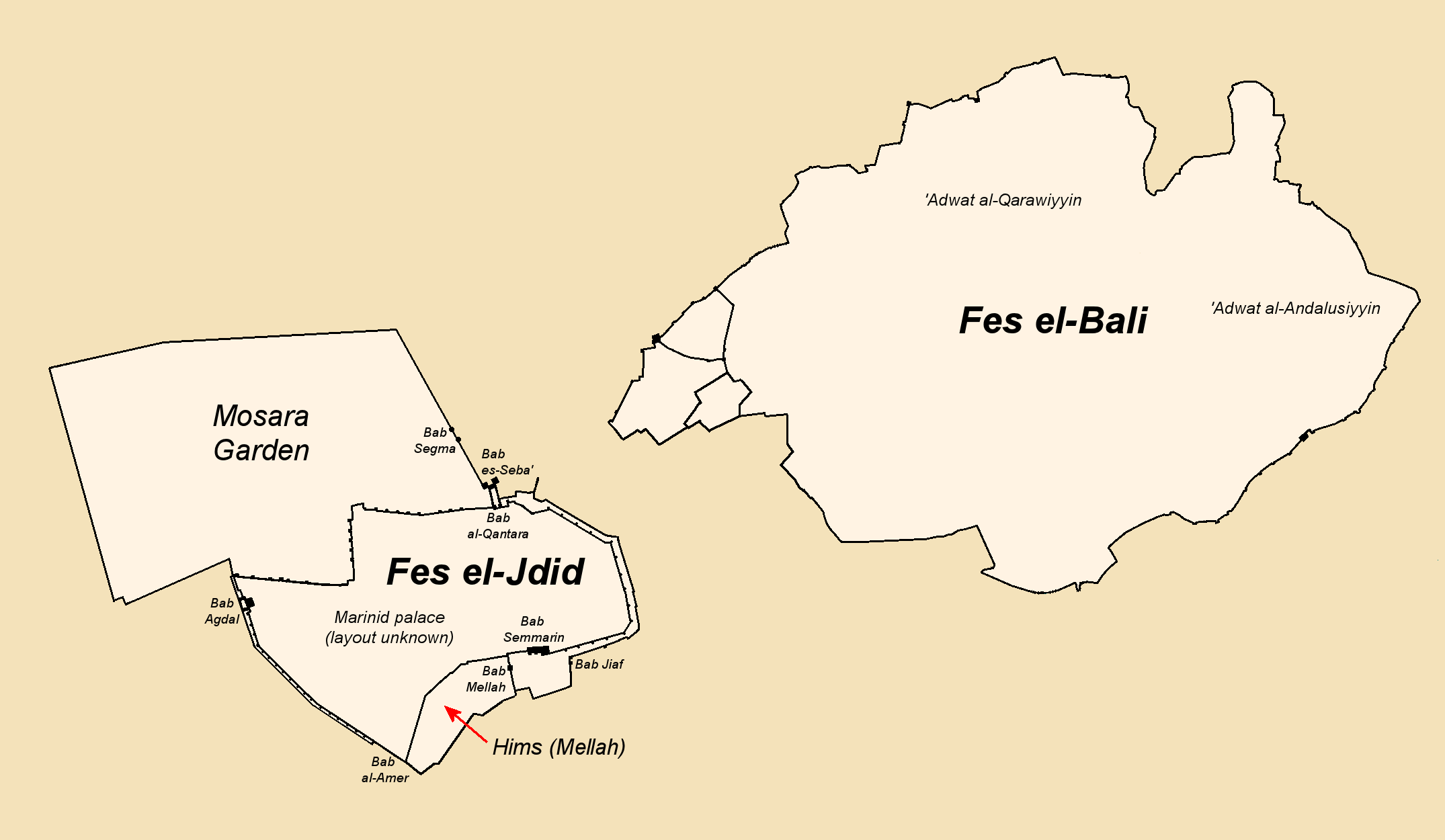
Location and possible layout of Fes el-Jdid and the Mosara Garden in the Marinid period, with the old city of Fes to the right (according to Bressolette and Delarozière)

The gardens covered 67 hectares to the north of Fes el-Jdid and the Royal Palace; an area comparable in size to the city itself. They were located on the land that is now mostly occupied by the Bab Segma Cemetery. They were surrounded by their own walls which, according to Henri Bressolette and Jean Delarozière, were simply a continuation of the outer wall of Fes el-Jdid (which was protected by double walls along most of its perimeter, though the outer wall was generally smaller and less heavily fortified than the inner wall). A gate known as Bab Segma, with two massive octagonal towers, would have acted as an entrance to the gardens on their eastern side, not far from Bab Dekkakin and the northern entrance of the city.

According to a more recent study by Iñigo Almela, the gardens were instead separated from Fes el-Jdid by an open space and their southern perimeter ran along the north side of the Fes River, roughly along what is now Abu Bakr ibn al-Arabi Street, with their southeastern corner situated on the north side the current Bab Segma towers. Almela attributes the latter to the 19th-century construction works that modified the area around Bab Dekkakin.

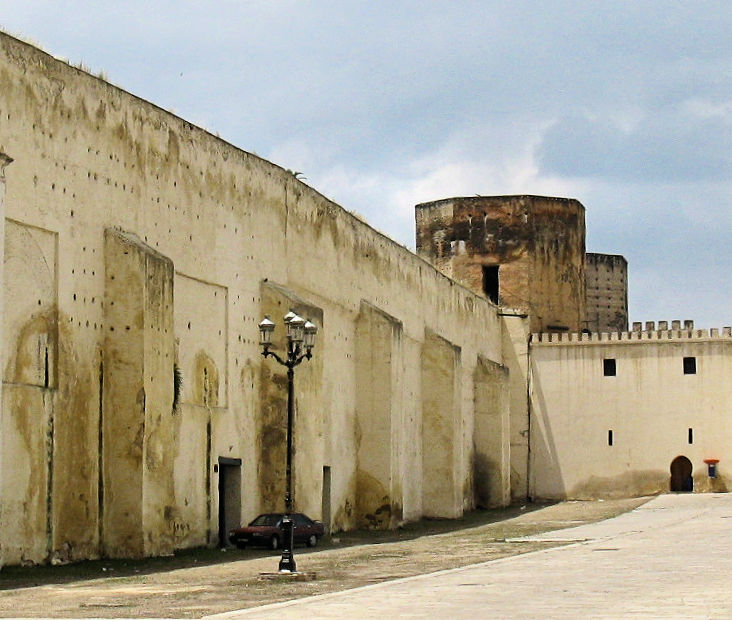
West wall of the New Mechouar (outer wall of the Dar al-Makina), which integrates the remains of the old Marinid aqueduct. The semi-circular outlines of its former arches are faintly visible along the wall, along with projecting buttresses that were part of its support. The octagonal towers of Bab Segma are visible at the end: the dark rectangular opening is presumed to be where the aqueduct passed inside the towers.

The creation and maintenance of the gardens required the diversion of water from the Fes River which flowed along the north edge of Fes el-Jdid. The water was raised into an aqueduct via a huge noria (waterwheel) measuring 26 metres in diameter and 2 metres wide. The noria, sometimes referred to as the "Grand Noria", was located next to Bab Dekkakin. Its enormous wheel was made of wood, reportedly covered in copper. The wheel was set inside a relatively massive supporting structure which, unlike the wheel, has been mostly preserved intact. Its walls are built of rammed earth, lime mortar, and brick. Its rectangular layout contains a long empty space in the middle that accommodated the wheel and a 2 metre-wide canal where the river water passed. The water was lifted to about 20 metres (66 ft) above the level of the river, matching the highest point of the gardens. From this noria, the aqueduct then carried the water to Bab Segma further north, and from there it was carried further into the gardens and its water basins. According to one historical source, at least three other norias operated inside the gardens and were crucial to their existence.

Inside the gardens were several structures and amenities. One was a msalla, an open-air prayer area, known as the Msalla of the Sultan or the Msalla of Bab Segma. There were at least two structures inside the garden whose traces can still be discerned, although heavily damaged by time and by the area's re-use as a cemetery. One of them was located in the northwestern part of the gardens (visible in the western part of the present-day cemetery), while the other structure was located to the east, closer to the center. The latter one was larger and was enclosed by its own perimeter wall. Both consisted primarily of a rectangular pavilion fronted by a rectangular water basin. This is similar in concept to the pavilions in other royal garden estates in the western Islamic world, such as those in the Agdal and Menara gardens in Marrakesh or the Partal Palace of the Alhambra in Granada. Attached to southwestern corner of the perimeter wall of the larger (eastern) pavilion was a tower structure, perhaps used for enjoying views of the surroundings, whose walls have been partially preserved to the present day. Another large water basin also existed about 250 metres (820 ft) west of this complex, whose remains were recorded in the 20th century, but has since been destroyed by landscaping and construction on the southwest side of the cemetery.

== See also ==
- Fortifications of Fez
- Jnan Sbil Gardens
