= Bab Dekkakin =

City gate in Morocco

- باب الدكاكين
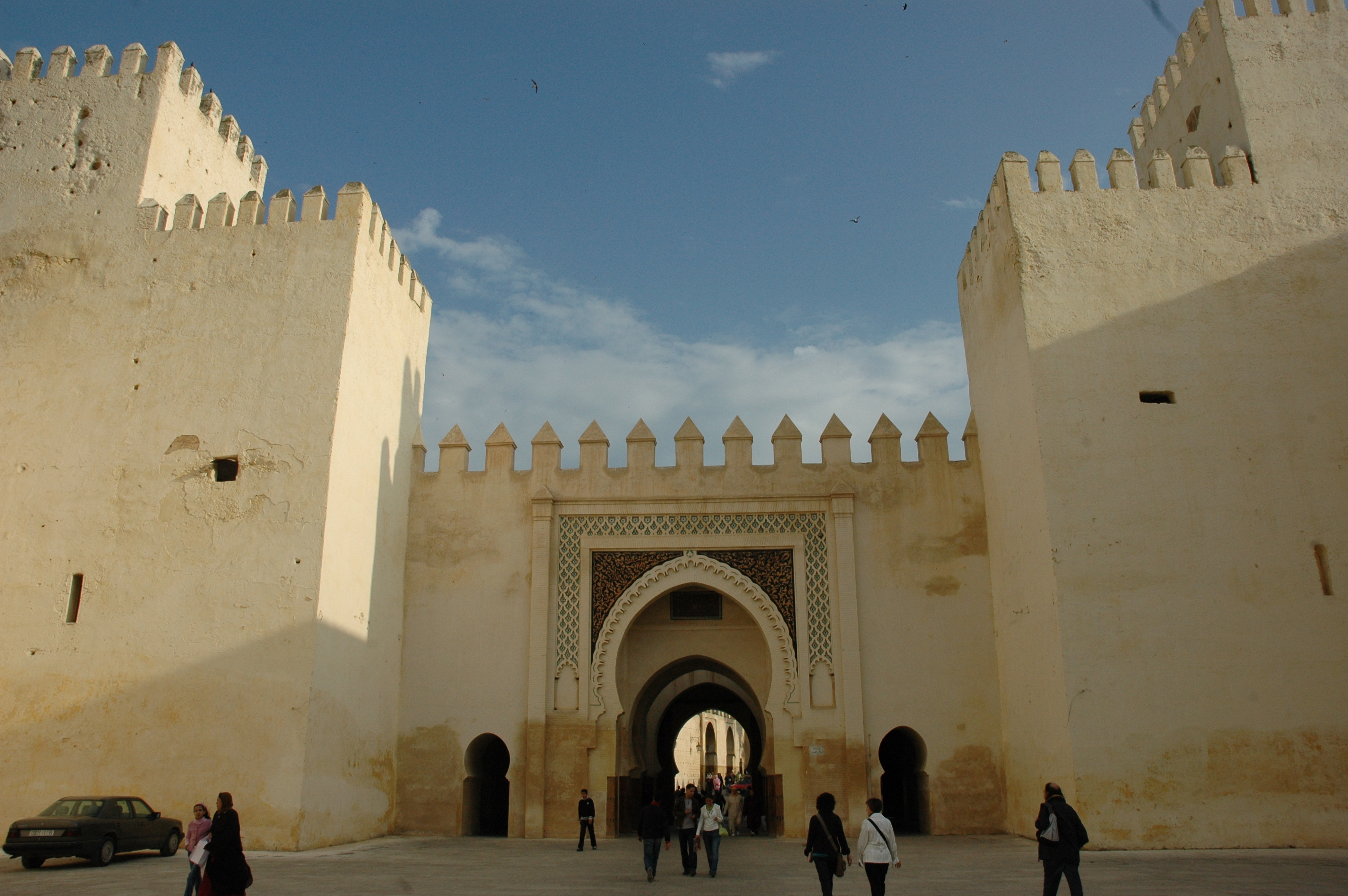
- The outer (northern) facade of Bab Dekkakin.
- Interactive map of the Bab Dekkakin area
- Former names: Bab Sebaa

General information
- Type: city gate
- Architectural style: Marinid, Moorish, Moroccan
- Location: Fez, Morocco
- Coordinates: 34°03′31.2″N 4°59′28.9″W
- Completed: circa 1276 CE (date of foundation of Fes el-Jdid)
- Renovated: 1885-86 CE (1302 AH)

Bab Dekkakin or Bab Dekakene (Arabic: باب الدكاكين, romanized: bab ad-dekakin, lit. 'gate of the benches') is a fortified and ceremonial gate in Fes, Morocco. The gate is situated between the Old Mechouar and the New Mechouar on the northern edge of Fes el-Jdid.

== Origin of name ==
The gate's original name was as Bab es-Sebaa ("Gate of the Lion"), probably in reference to a carved image or motif of a lion that has since disappeared.

Originally, the name "Bab Dekkakin" was actually the name of what is now the gate to the Royal Palace itself, which was formerly the main entrance to the city (originally called Bab el-Oued or Bab el-Qantara) before the palace expanded to this point. Only later did the name come to designate Bab es-Sebaa. The name Bab Dekkakin means "Gate of the Benches" and is a reference to the previous existence of benches along the sides of the gate where those who were granted an audience inside the Palace would wait until called upon.

== History ==
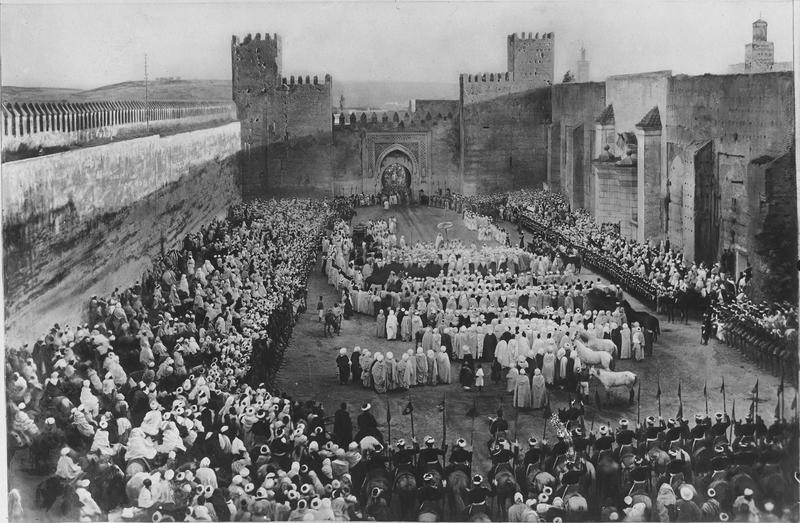
1916 photograph of the New Mechouar in front of Bab Dekkakin, with a ceremony of tribes coming to present gifts to the sultan

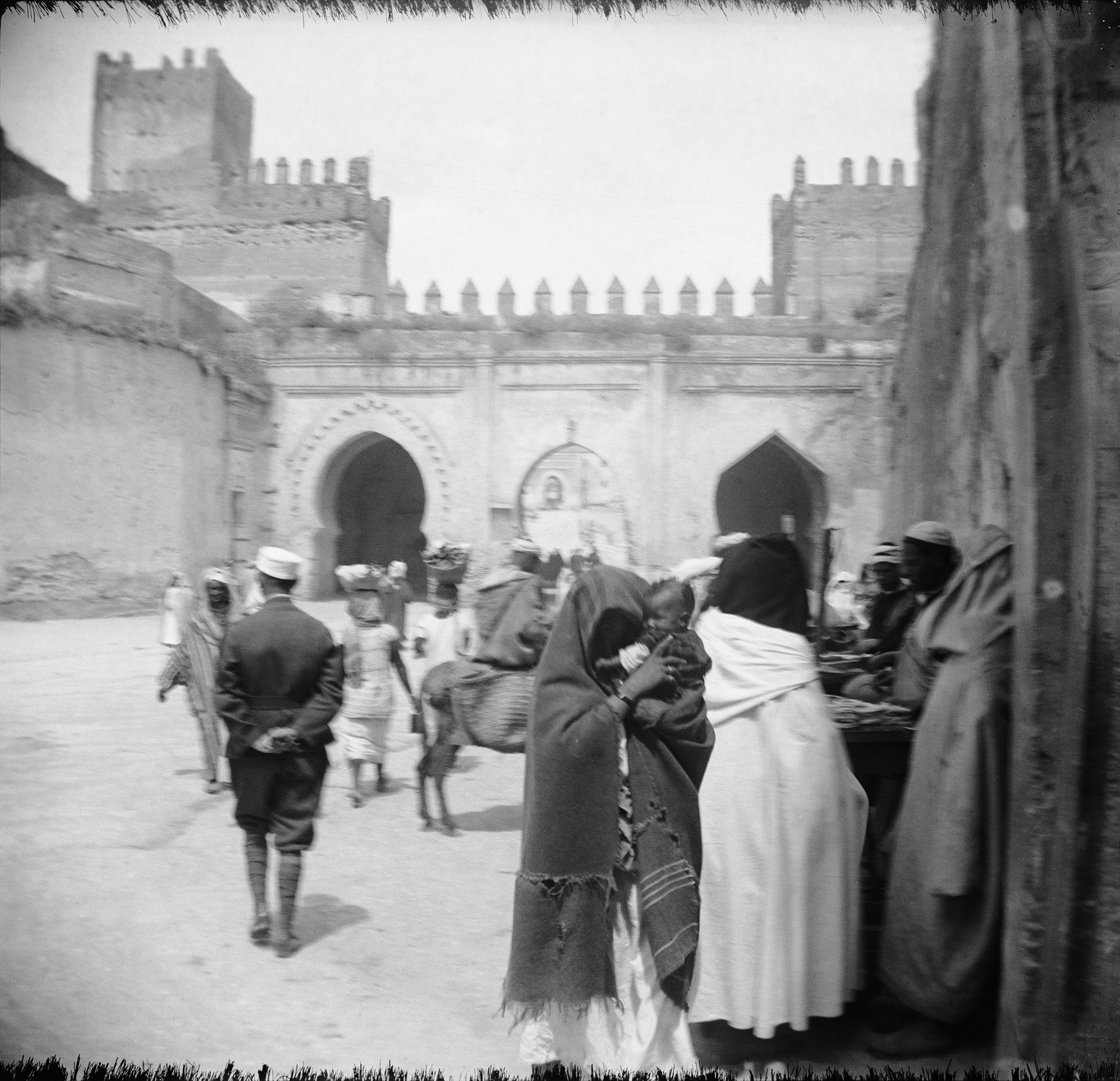
Bab Dekkakin seen from the Old Mechouar, photographed around 1920. The archway to the left was the original entrance/exit on this side, back when the gate had a bent entrance for defensive purposes. The central passage was opened up in 1884 and the archway on the right was created later for symmetry (though at the time of this photograph it was not yet decorated to match the appearance of the left arch).

Fes el-Jdid ("New Fes") was founded in 1276 by Sultan Abu Yusuf Ya'qub as the new capital of the Marinid Sultanate as a separate agglomeration overlooking the nearby older city of Fes (Fes el-Bali; "Old Fes"). The city included the sultan's royal palace (Dar al-Makhzen), which has served as the residence of the rulers of Morocco during many periods and is still used on occasion by the King of Morocco today.

Bab Dekkakin dates from the original Marinid foundation in 1276 and was part of the main northern entrance to the city. Its layout was highly defensive and it originally had a bent entrance (forcing attackers to turn multiple corners when passing through it). Flanked by two pairs of tall square towers, some scholars believe that the outer towers, higher than the inner ones, were added to the gate in 1286 during the construction of the aqueduct that supplied water to the Marinid royal gardens to the north of the city. The towers may have been intended partly to protect both the aqueduct and the huge noria (waterwheel) which raised water to it and which would have been almost as tall as the towers themselves.

The gate gave access to what is now the Old Mechouar square, but originally this square actually served as a fortified bridge over the Oued Fes. At its south end was the Bab el-Oued ("Gate of the River") or Bab al-Qantara ("Gate of the Bridge"), the main gate into the city itself. This southern gate later became the gate of the Royal Palace when the latter was expanded up to this point in the late 19th century, after which point the square in front of it became a mechouar.

The mechouar area, much like the palace, has been modified and expanded over the centuries. On the north side of Bab Dekkakin, the New Mechouar, larger than the old one, was created either by the Alaouite Sultan Moulay Muhammad ibn Abdallah (Mohammed III) during his reign (1757-1790) or by the later Alaouite sultan Moulay Hassan (ruled 1873-1894) who is credited with expanding the palace to its current size. On the western side of New Mechouar square is a gateway in the Italianate architectural style which belongs to the Makina (Dar al-Makina), a former arms factory established by Moulay Hassan in 1886 with the help of Italian officers. Originally, this western wall was actually the large Marinid aqueduct built in 1287 to carry water to the Marinid royal gardens; the faint outline of its arches can still be seen today along the surface of the wall. The northern gate of the New Mechouar, across from Bab Dekkakin, known as Bab Kbibat es-Smen ("Gate of the Butter Niche"), also dates from this 1886 construction, though another gate called Bab Segma once stood near here and its name is still used as a toponym for the area.

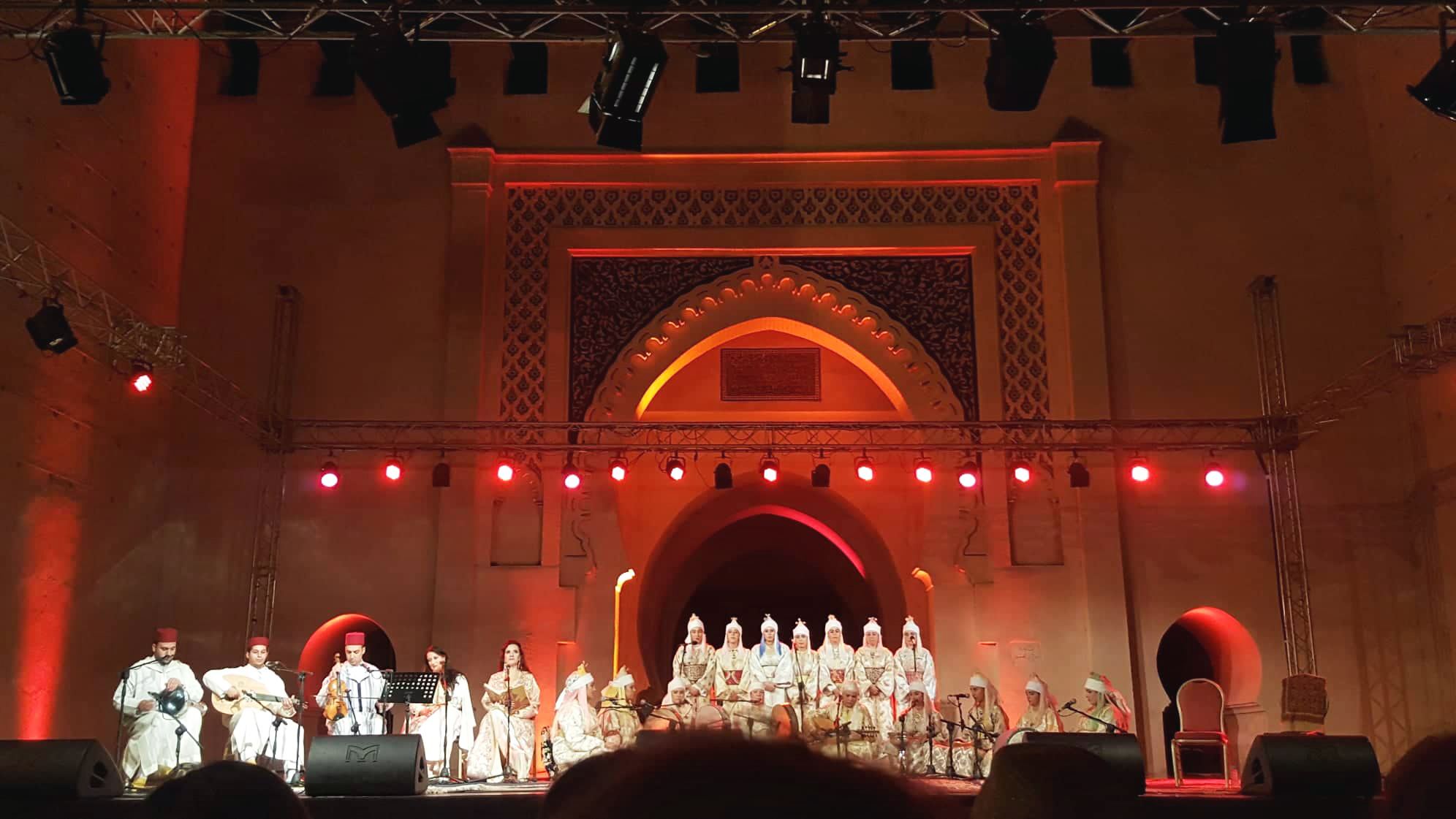
Performance at the World Sacred Music Festival at the New Mechouar, in front of Bab Dekkakin.

Bab Dekkakin itself was restored and modified in 1884, in the reign of Sultan Moulay Hassan. In particular, the gate's central arch was opened up to provide a straight or direct passage across it instead of the original bent entrance, in order to facilitate circulation (similar to what was later done to Bab Semmarine too). In or after 1912, another passage or archway was opened on the east side of the central arch (to the left when seen from the Old Mechouar) and was given a similar decorative outline as the western archway in order to create visual symmetry. The overall form of the gate, however, including the massive towers flanking it, appear to be original from the Marinid period. Up to the early 20th century, there was also a prison attached to Bab Dekkakin, where prisoners serving long sentences were kept.

Today, the gate also serves as a backdrop for performances taking place inside the New Mechouar during the annual World Sacred Music Festival.

== Architecture ==
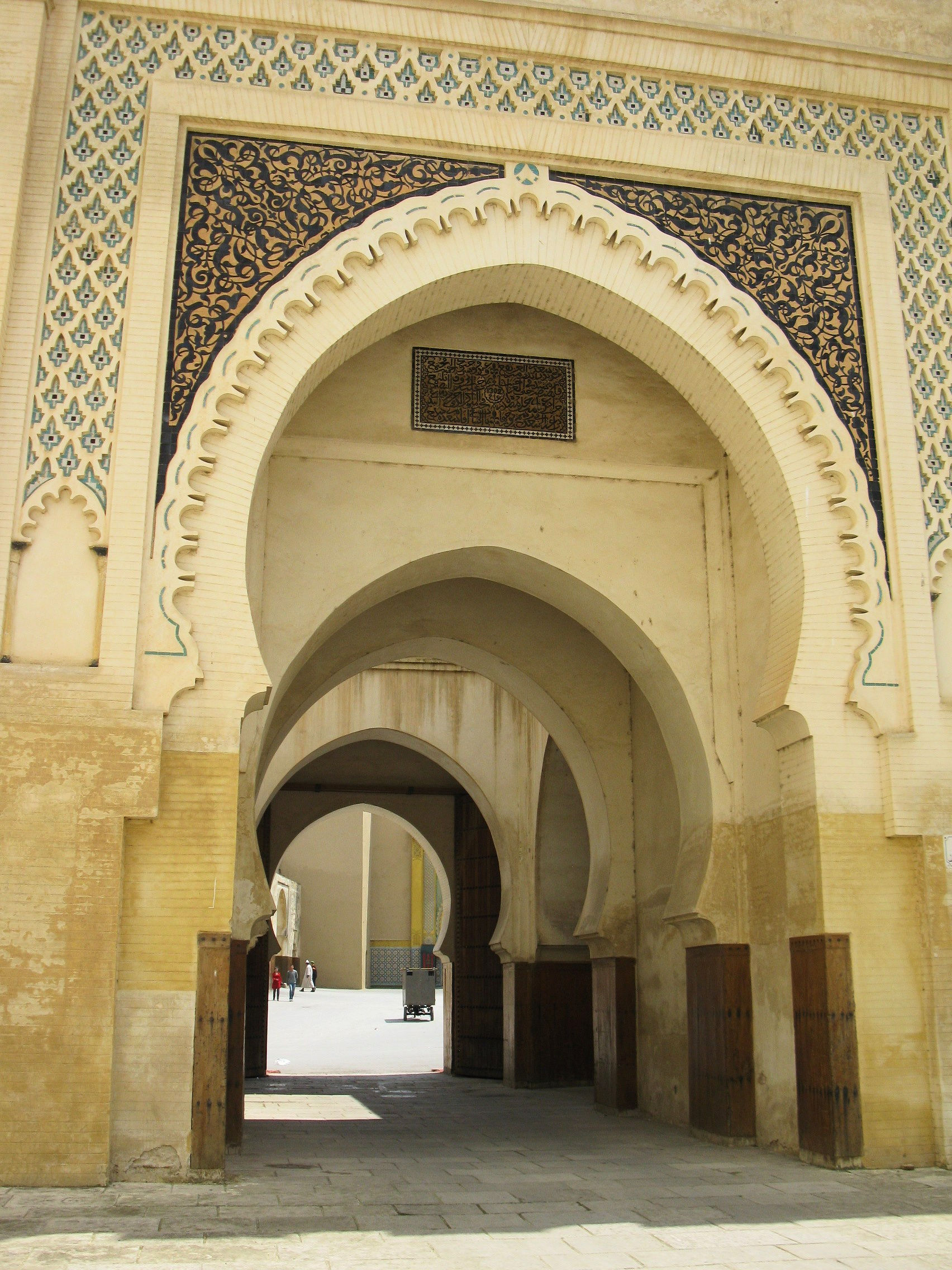
View of the decoration around the central arch of the gate on the outer (northern) facade.

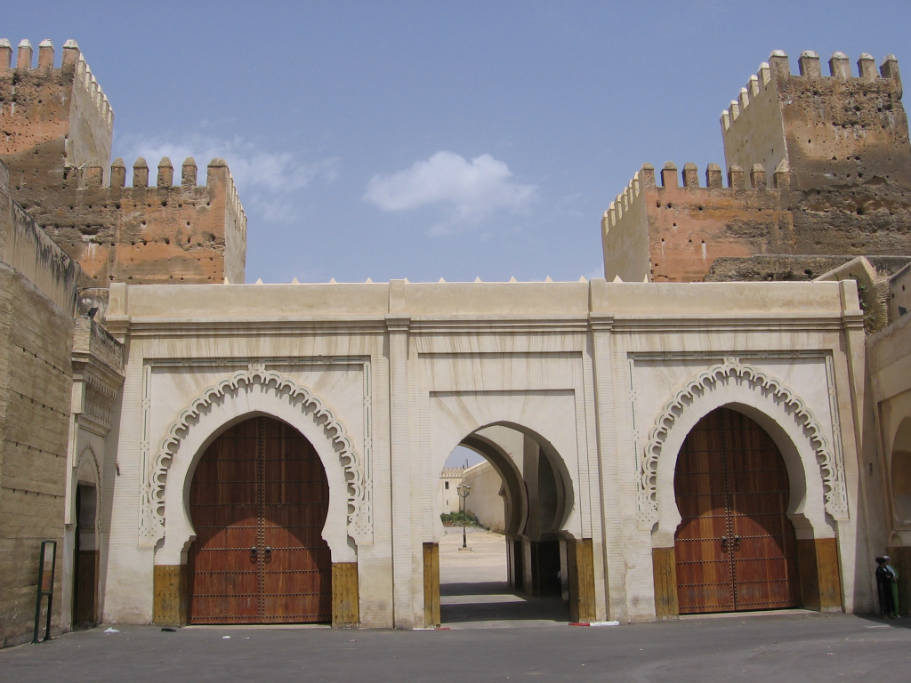
Present-day view of the inner (southern) side of Bab Dekkakin facing the Old Mechouar.

The gate's inner side faces the Old Mechouar and the northeastern gate to the Royal Palace, historically the main entrance to the palace grounds (until the construction of the new palace gates in the southwest in the 20th century). Its outer facade faces the New Mechouar.

The gate is made of masonry stone and brick and set between two pairs of massive square towers that are indicative of Marinid military architecture. The interior passage of the gate is composed of several horseshoe archways arranged at the thresholds of three sequential chambers. The middle chamber is open to the sky above; a defensive feature from the original gate which allowed defenders to shoot or drop projectiles on attackers inside the gate's passage. In addition to this central passage, however, are two other side passages through smaller archways on the gate's outer facade and through equal-sized archways on its inner facade (thus appearing as a triple gateway on this side). This symmetrical arrangement is a result of modern modifications to the gate to ease circulation. The original gate had a bent entrance: from the central opening on its north (outer) side, the gate's inside passage turned 90 degrees twice and emerged at what is now the westernmost archway on the Old Mechouar side.

The gate's outer facade is also its most richly decorated. The outline of the central archway is decorated with a molding sculpted in a repeating semi-circular motif. The spandrels above this are filled with tiles painted with interlacing arabesque (vegetal or floral) patterns. All of this is in turn surrounded by a rectangular frame consisting of a band or frieze carved into a darj wa ktaf motif (a Moroccan motif roughly resembling a repeating palmette or fleur-de-lys). Above the central archway is a panel of tiles featuring an elaborate Arabic inscription. The two lateral archways on the gate's inner facade are decorated with a simple semi-circular molding like the one around the central archway of the outer side, but otherwise there is little decoration on this facade.
