= Kasbah Cherarda =

Coordinates: 34°3′44″N 4°59′29″W

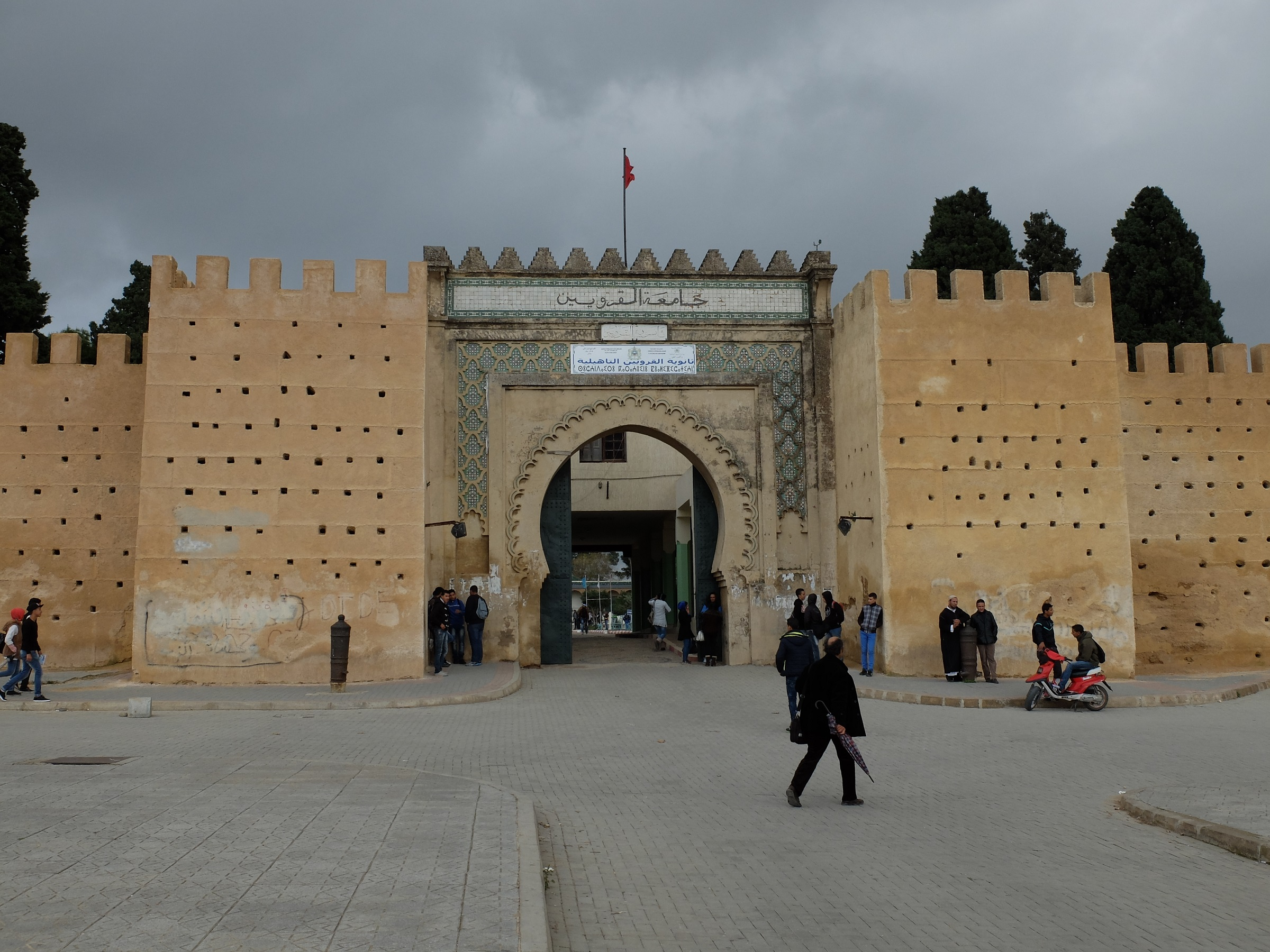
The gate of Kasbah Cherarda

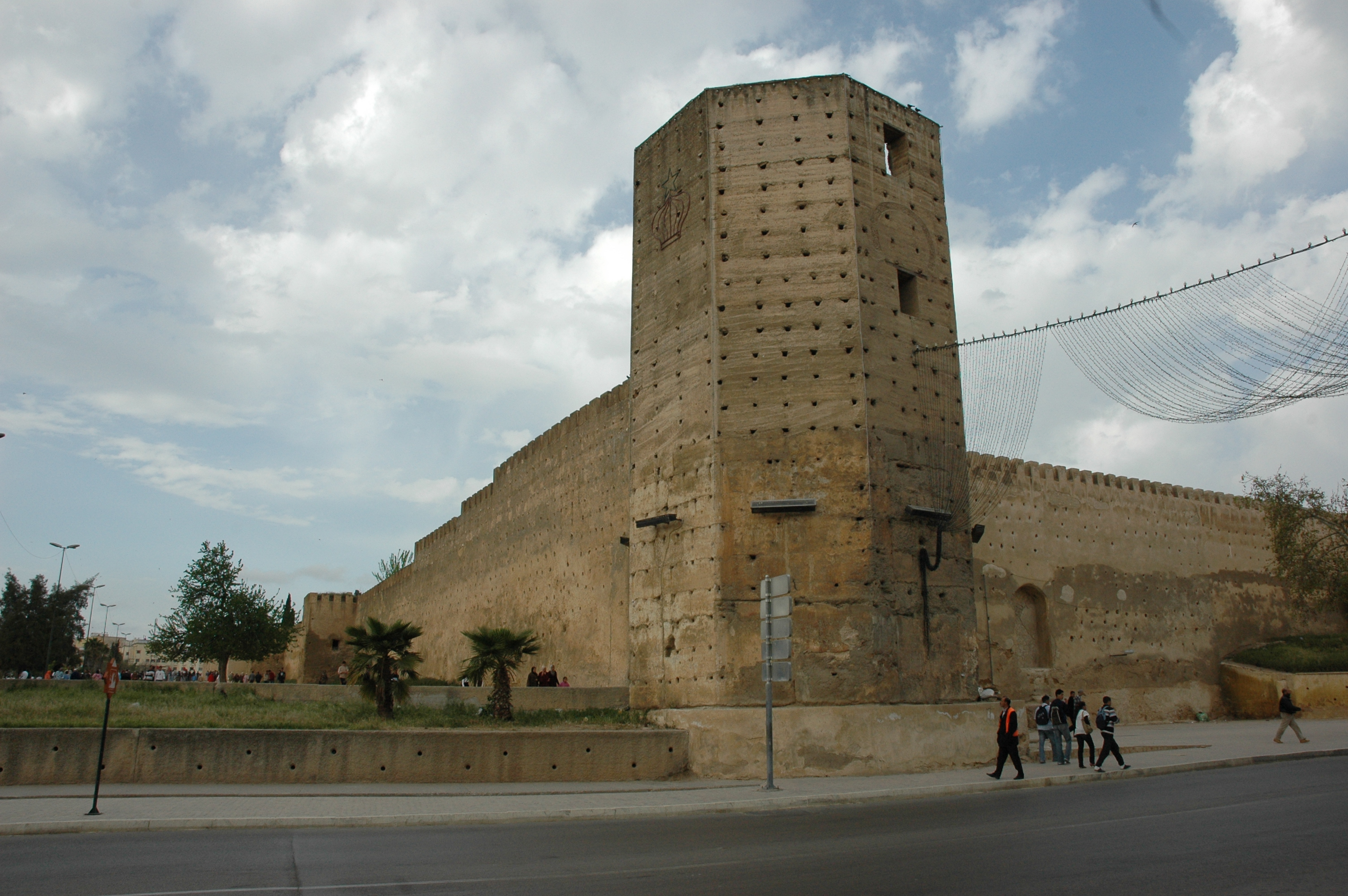
The walls of Kasbah Cherarda, and a separate bastion tower that belonged to the former gate called Bab Segma.

Kasbah Cherarda (Arabic: قصبة شراردة, romanized: Qaṣbat Sharārda) is a kasbah in the city of Fez, Morocco, located on the northern outskirts of Fes el-Jdid. It was initially referred to as Kasbah el-Khemis (Arabic: قصبة الخميس, romanized: Qaṣbat al-Khamīs, lit. 'Thursday Fort') as there was an open market held every Thursday outside the wall.

The name cherarda (or sherarda) originates from the name of an Arab tribe whose qaid had also previously built a kasbah here in order to protect the tribe's granaries. The current kasbah was created by the Alaouite sultan Mulay al-Rashid after he took over the city in 1666, acting as a garrison fort to house his tribal troops (referred to as guich or "army" tribes). It covers a large rectangular area measuring 400 by 550 meters. The tribe of Ashrafah occupied the fortress during the war between the Sultan and his brother Mohammed, before being deported. It constituted one of a number of similar fortifications established across the outskirts of Fez, throughout the city's history. Today the kasbah is occupied by a hospital, a high school, and, since 1959–60, a branch or annex of the University of al-Qarawiyyin.

== See also ==
- Fortifications of Fez
- Dar al-Makhzen (Royal Palace of Fez)
- Bab Segma
