= Royal Palace of Fez =

Dar al-Makhzen
- دار المخزن (Arabic)
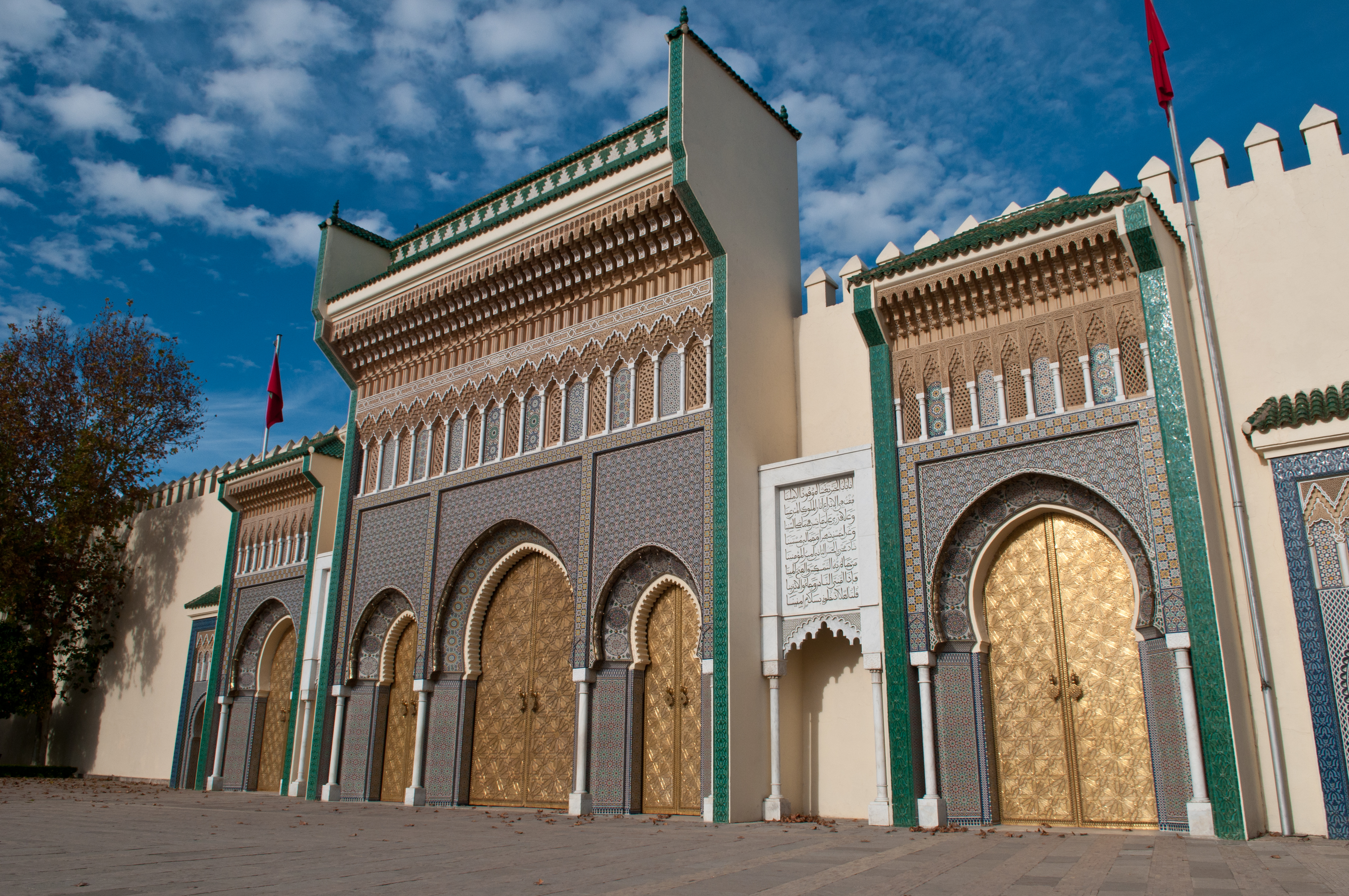
- The main gates of the Royal Palace today, at Place des Alaouites
- Interactive map of Dar al-Makhzen
- 34°03′11″N 4°59′37″W
- Type: Palace complex
- Location: Fez, Morocco

History
- Founded: 1276
- Founder: Yaqub ibn Abd al-Haqq
- Rebuilt: After 1666

Site notes
- Architectural styles: Moroccan, Islamic

The Royal Palace or Dar al-Makhzen (Arabic: دار المخزن, lit. 'House of the Makhzen') is the palace of the King of Morocco in the city of Fez, Morocco. (Note: Note that the name Dar al-Makhzen is used for royal palaces throughout Morocco.) Its original foundation dates back to the foundation of Fes el-Jdid ("New Fez"), the royal citadel of the Marinid dynasty, in 1276. Most of the palace today dates from the 'Alawi era (17th–20th centuries). The vast grounds are home to multiple private structures, patios, and gardens, but historically also included administrative offices and government tribunals. Today, the most publicly visible parts of the palace are its main entrances at the Old Mechouar (to the northeast) and the highly ornate 20th-century gates at Place des Alaouites, near the Mellah (to the southwest).

== History ==
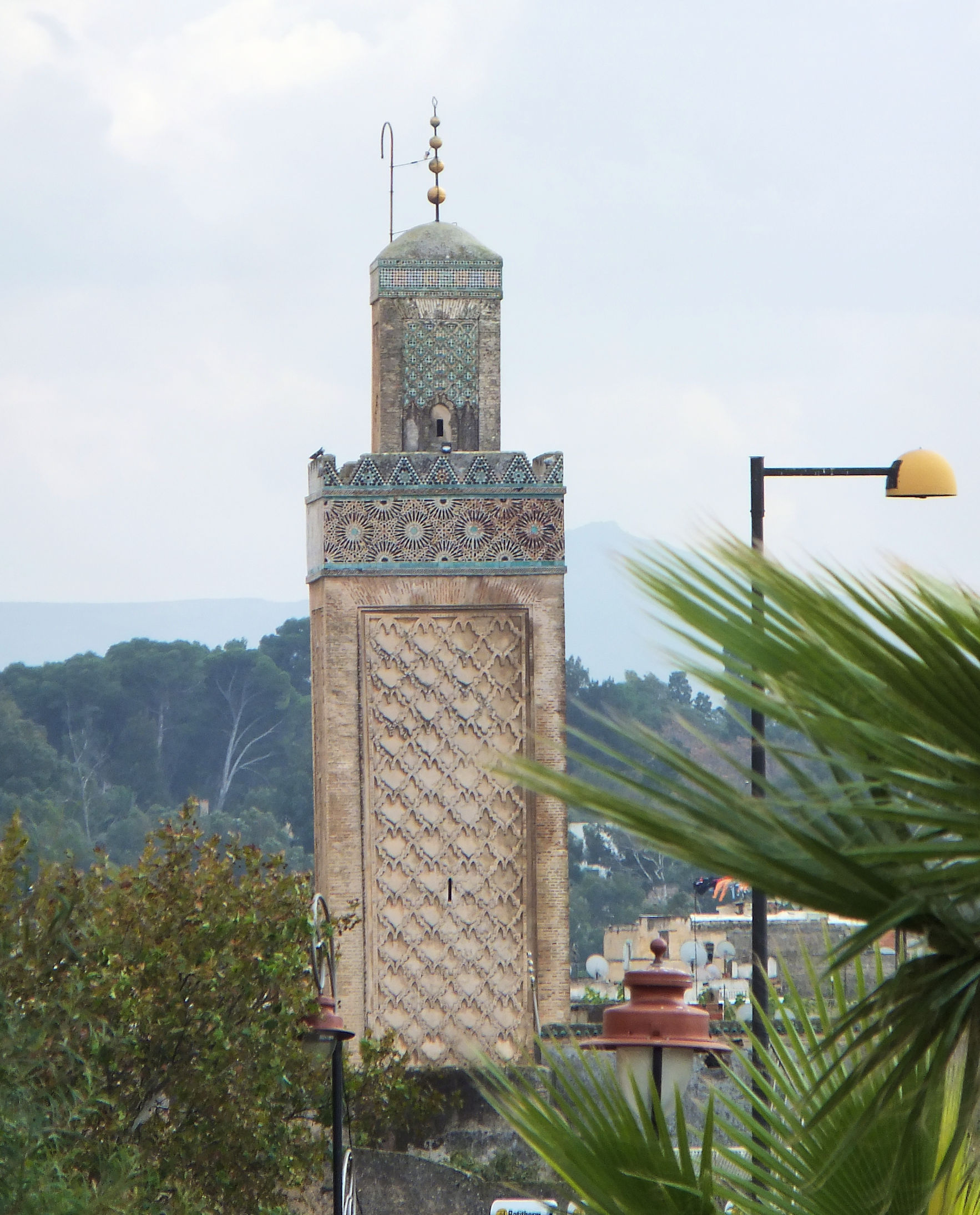
The minaret of the Grand Mosque of Fes el-Jdid, which dates back to the original Marinid foundation of Fes el-Jdid (1276) and was connected to the Dar al-Makhzen

=== Marinid foundation (13th century and after) ===
The palace was founded and initially built, along with the rest of Fes el-Jdid, by the Marinid sultan Abu Yusuf Ya'qub in 1276. It served as the new royal residence and center of government for Morocco under Marinid rule. Before this, the main center of power and government in Fes had been the Kasbah Bou Jeloud on the western edge of the old city (at the location of the still extant Bou Jeloud Mosque). The decision to create a new and highly fortified citadel separate from the old city (Fes el-Bali) may have reflected a continuous wariness of Moroccan rulers towards the highly independent and sometimes restive population of Fes. The Grand Mosque of Fes el-Jdid, adjacent to the palace grounds, was also founded at the same time as the new city in 1276 and was connected by a private passage directly to the palace, allowing the sultan to come and go for prayers.

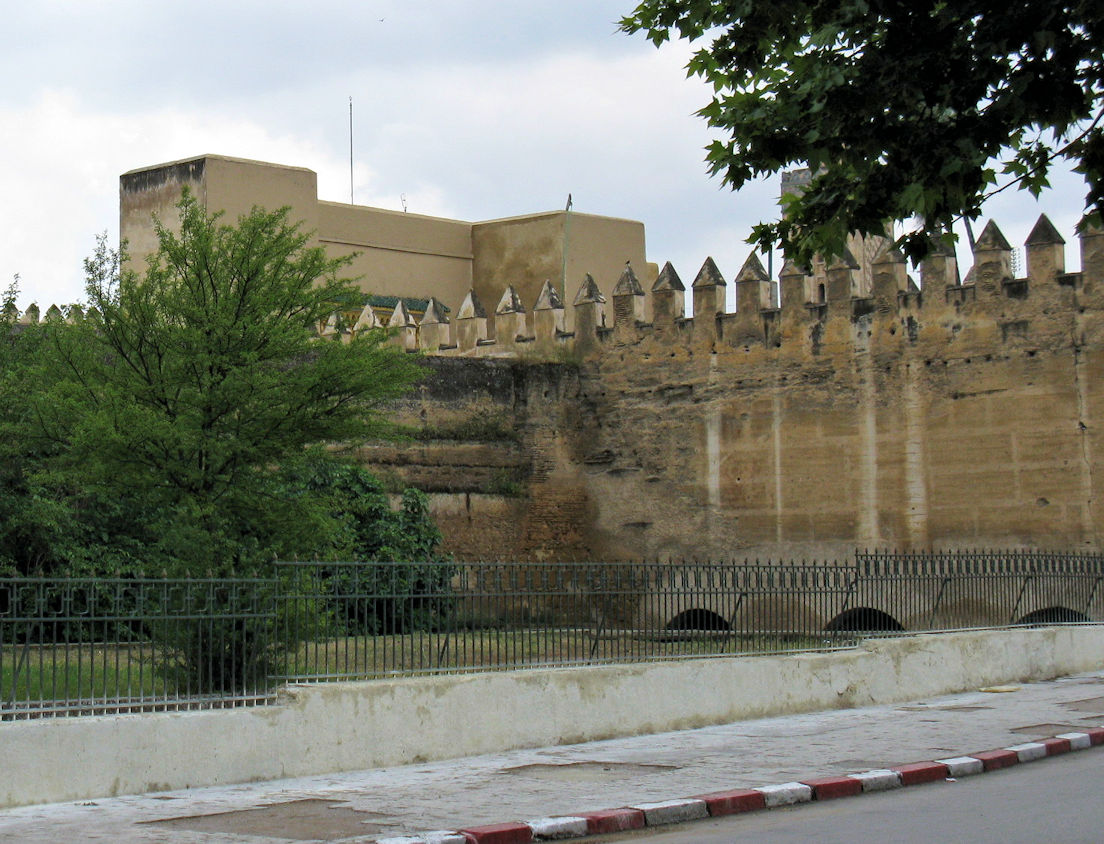
Outer walls of the Old Mechouar today; the arches at its base are culverts where the Fez River passes under the mechouar

Although the original layout of the palace cannot be fully reconstructed due to centuries of subsequent expansion and modification, it was most likely concentrated further southwest within the current palace grounds. What is now the Old Mechouar (a large walled courtyard preceding the main public entrance to the palace) was at that time a fortified bridge over the Oued Fes (Fes River) at the northern entrance to the city, and was most likely not directly connected to the palace itself. In addition to the main palace structures at the center of the city, the palace was also flanked by a large park or garden area to the west which was characterized by elevated terraces and pavilions, most likely corresponding to the site of the present-day Lalla Mina Gardens in the current palace. These first gardens were known as the "Agdal" (not to be confused with the current Agdal Gardens further west) and followed a tradition already established in Almoravid and Almohad times, as exemplified by the older Agdal Gardens of Marrakesh. The western edge of these gardens was in turn bounded by the western walls of the city. A gate known as Bab Agdal still stands here today and preserves its old Marinid-era layout.

Abu Yusuf Ya'qub had also wished to create a vast pleasure garden outside the palace, perhaps in emulation of those he might have admired in Granada (such as the Generalife); however, he died in 1286 before this could be accomplished. His son and successor, Abu Ya'qub Yusuf, carried out the work instead in 1287, creating the vast Mosara Garden to the north of Fes el-Jdid. This garden was supplied with water from the Oued Fes via an aqueduct fed by an enormous noria (waterwheel) near Bab Dekkakin. Both the gardens and the noria fell into disuse after the Marinid period and eventually disappeared, leaving only traces.

=== 'Alawi period (17th century and after) ===
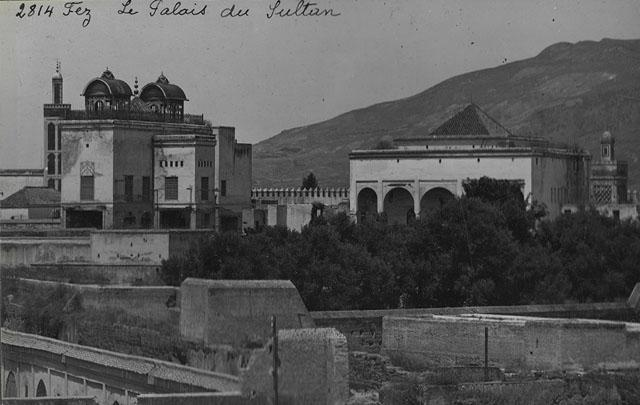
Roofline of the royal palace grounds (in a 1920s photo). The tall structures seen here are part of the Dar Ayad al-Kebira. The minaret of the Lalla Mina Mosque is partly visible behind the structure on the left.

Following years of neglect, the original Marinid constructions mostly fell into disrepair and were only restored, rebuilt, or replaced when the 'Alawi sultans re-invested in Fes and made it the capital of Morocco again (with the exception of certain periods). As a result, the current structures in the palace mainly date from the 'Alawi period, from the 17th century and after. Sultan Moulay Rashid, the first 'Alawi sultan to unify Morocco, captured Fez in 1666. In 1671, he ordered the creation of a vast rectangular courtyard in the eastern part of the palace. The courtyard, still extant today, was adorned with green zellij tiles and centered around a large rectangular water basin. This addition extended the Dar al-Makhzen grounds up to the edge of the Lalla ez-Zhar Mosque, which had previously stood in the middle of a residential neighbourhood, and cutting off one of the local streets. This was one of several occasions where the expansion of the palace cut into the general residential areas of Fes el-Jdid. Moulay Rashid also built the vast Kasbah Cherarda north of Fes el-Jdid in order to house his tribal troops. The housing of troops here also liberated new space in Fes el-Jdid itself, including the northwestern area which became the new Moulay Abdallah neighbourhood from the early 18th century onwards. This is where Sultan Moulay Abdallah (ruled between 1729 and 1757) erected a large mosque and royal necropolis for the 'Alawi dynasty. Abdallah's successor, Sultan Mohammed ben Abdallah (ruled 1748 and 1757–1790), was responsible, according to some sources, for establishing the New Mechouar and the Old Mechouar. However, other studies and later authors attribute this arrangement to Moulay Hassan I's reign a century later (see below). Mohammed ben Abdallah also built the Dar Ayad al-Kebira, one of the more imposing structures inside the palace grounds.

Major expansions and modifications continued throughout the 19th century. Under sultan Moulay Abd al-Rahman (ruled 1822–1859) the Bab Bou Jat Mechouar or Grand Mechouar was created to the west of the Moulay Abdallah quarter, providing the palace grounds with another ceremonial entrance to the northwest. Moulay Abd al-Rahman also revived the gardens of the palace to the west, up to the old western Marinid walls of the city, by creating the Lalla Mina or Lalla Amina Gardens (on the site of earlier Marinid-era gardens) and building the adjoining Lalla Mina Mosque. West of these, beyond the old walls, an even larger walled garden known today as the Agdal was established by Sultan Moulay Hassan I (ruled 1873–1894). (According to one author, the Lalla Mina Mosque is also attributed to Moulay Hassan.)

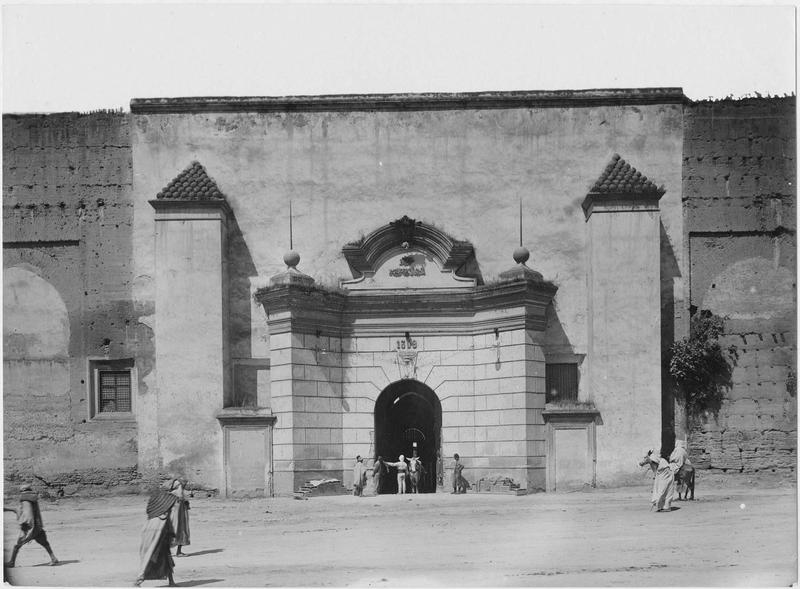
The entrance gate of the Dar al-Makina at the New Mechouar (photo from 1913)

It also seems to have been under Moulay Hassan that the Dar al-Makhzen grounds were extended northwards up to the south gate of the Old Mechouar, thus turning the latter into the main entrance of the palace instead of the main entrance of the city. This forced the diversion of the northern end of Fes el-Jdid's main street so that it now enters the Old Mechouar from the side. The new expansion included a vast rectangular courtyard to serve as an "inner mechouar", followed by several other courtyards extending up to the Old Mechouar's gate. This inner mechouar was lined by arcades and housed a number of public and administrative functions like the mahkama (courthouse). This mechouar also lay between the Grand Mosque of Fes el-Jdid and its former madrasa (the Madrasa of Fes el-Jdid or Madrasa Dar al-Makhzen), cutting them off from each other and resulting in the madrasa being integrated into the palace. According to scholars it was Moulay Hassan who then built what is now known as the New Mechouar on the north side Bab Dekkakin and of the Old Mechouar. Next to this he also built the Dar al-Makina factory on the west side of the new square in 1886. Lastly, Moulay Hassan also connected Fes el-Jdid and Fes el-Bali (the old city) for the first time with a large corridor of walls. Inside this space he commissioned a number of royal gardens (such as Jnan Sbil) and summer palaces (such as Dar Batha), which were separate but associated or connected with the palace.

Historically, members of the public and government officials only had access to the first few courtyards of the Dar al-Makhzen, from the Old Mechouar to the "Inner Mechouar", due to public government institutions and tribunals being housed here. The Old Mechouar and the adjoining courtyards were thus a reception and waiting area for those who had business inside the palace. The rest of the palace further west, on the other hand, made up the sultan's private residence and was not accessible to anyone but the sultan, his family, and his inner circle.

=== From 20th century to present day ===
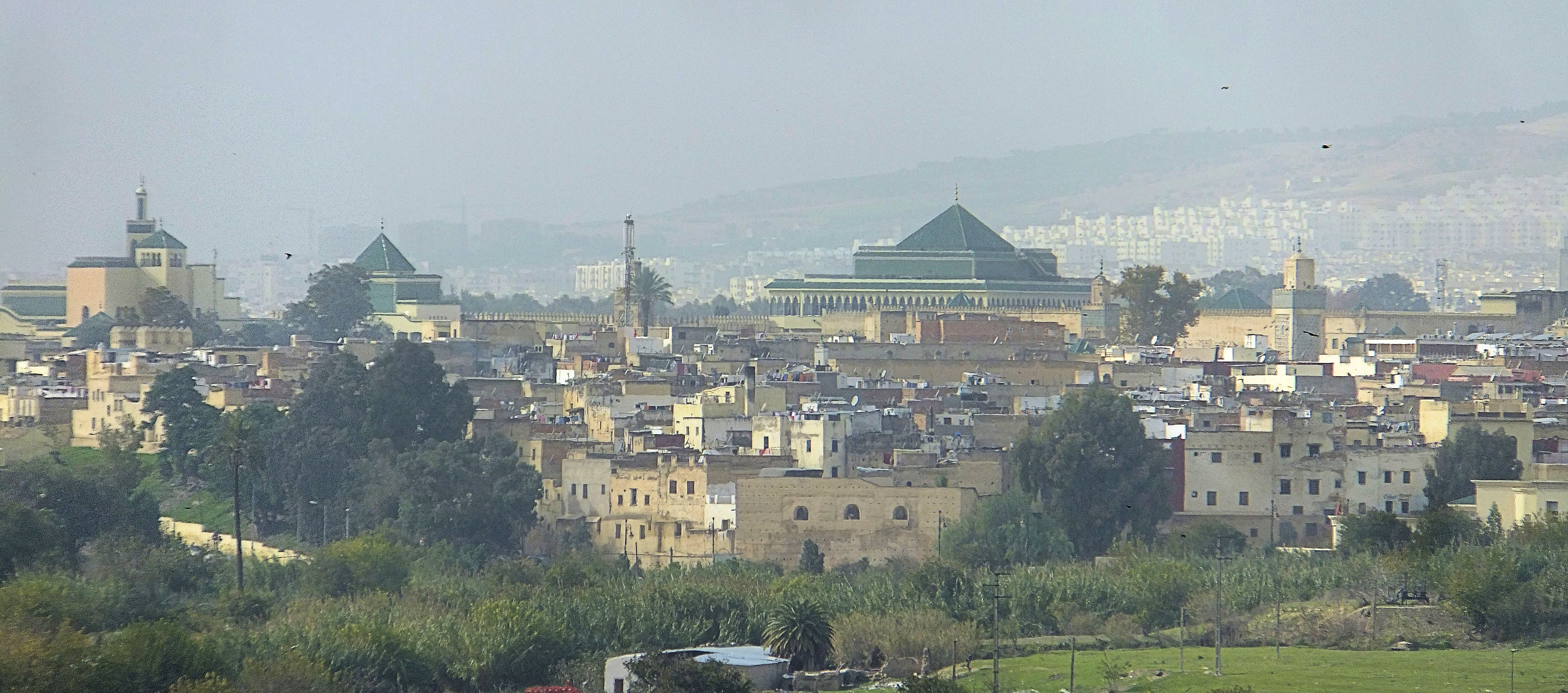
The skyline of the palace today, within Fes el-Jdid, seen from the east: the tall structures on the left are part of the Dar Ayad al-Kebira, with the minaret of the Lalla Mina Mosque partly visible behind it.

After Moulay Hassan, his son and successor Moulay Abd al-Aziz (ruled 1894–1908) constructed a palace pavilion, known as Dar al-Fassiya, on the western edge of the central palace structures, on the north side of the Lalla Mina Gardens. It was adjoined by a marble-paved courtyard and some of its rooms had ceilings gilded with gold leaf, but it was later abandoned and even partly looted. His successor, Moulay Abd al-Hafid (ruled 1908–1912), began in turn the construction of a large multi-story pavilion which was to include the first elevators in the palace, but its construction was not completed and it stood unfinished for many years.

Following the advent of French colonial rule in 1912, the capital of Morocco was moved to Rabat and never returned to Fes. Some of the outlying branches of the palace, such as the Dar Batha and Dar el-Beida near Fes el-Bali, were occupied by the offices of the French authorities and of the French resident-general. In the 1960s King Hassan II reoriented the entrance of the palace complex from the Old Mechouar in the north to a new southern approach facing the modern Ville Nouvelle ("New City") of Fes. A new grand square, Place des Alaouites (''Alawi Square'), was laid out and new ornate gates to the palace were built between 1969 and 1971. Although no longer the royal palace of the capital, the main palace complex in Fes is still regularly used by the King of Morocco today. The palace is thus not open to the public.

== Description ==
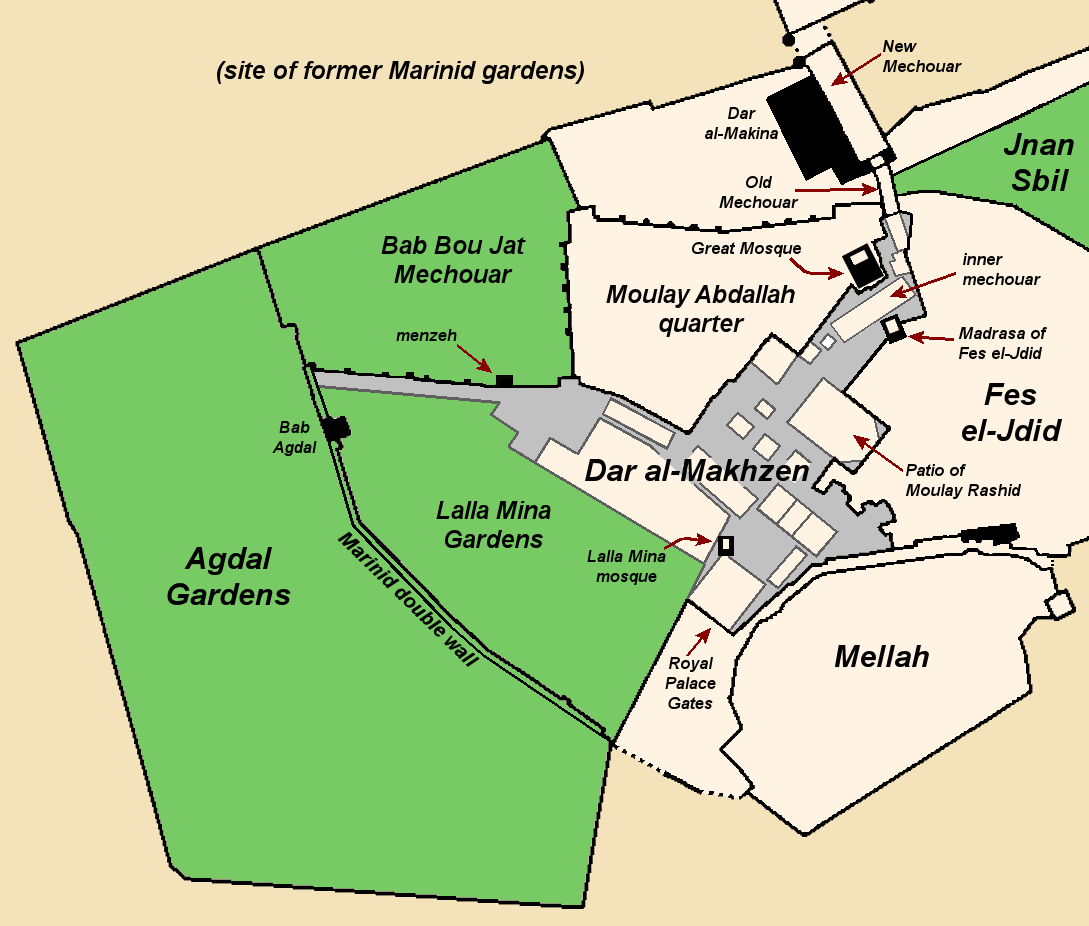
Layout of the Dar al-Makhzen today, with some of its historical elements and relevant nearby landmarks identified

The palace is located in Fes el-Jdid ("New Fes"), the fortified royal district founded by the Marinid sultans in 1276. Today it covers 80 hectares, taking up much of the city's area. Inside, the vast palace grounds are taken up by numerous courtyards, residential pavilions, gardens, and fountains. Its complicated and irregular layout is the result of repeated modifications, reconstructions, and expansions over the centuries, much of it now dating to the 'Alawi period (17th-20th centuries).

=== The mechouars ===
In the context of palace architecture, the term "mechouar" (from the French transliteration, méchouar, of Arabic المشور, also transliterated as mishwar or meshwar in English) generally refers to an official square or courtyard at the entrance of the royal palace. Such squares were used for various open-air ceremonies, the reception of ambassadors, and as waiting areas for those entering the palace. They were often also part of the setting for the dispensation of justice or the receiving of petitions to the ruler. For example, the main qadi (judge) of Fes Jdid held his tribunal near the entrance of the palace, located just inside the entrance from the Old Mechouar. There are at least three historical mechouars attached the royal palace of Fes.

==== Old Mechouar (Vieux Méchouar) ====
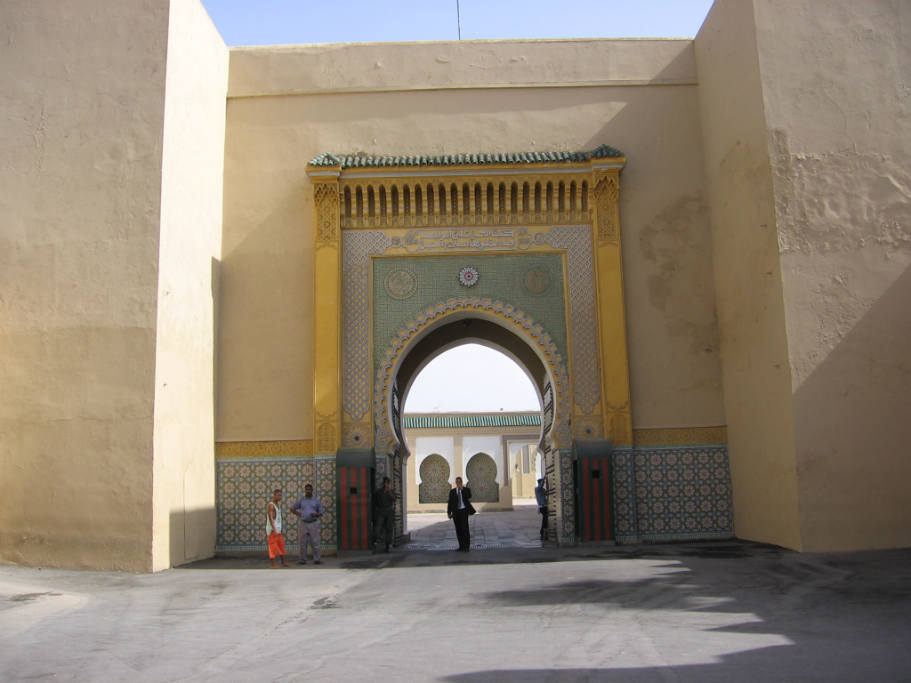
View of the Old Mechouar, looking south at the entrance to the Dar al-Makhzen

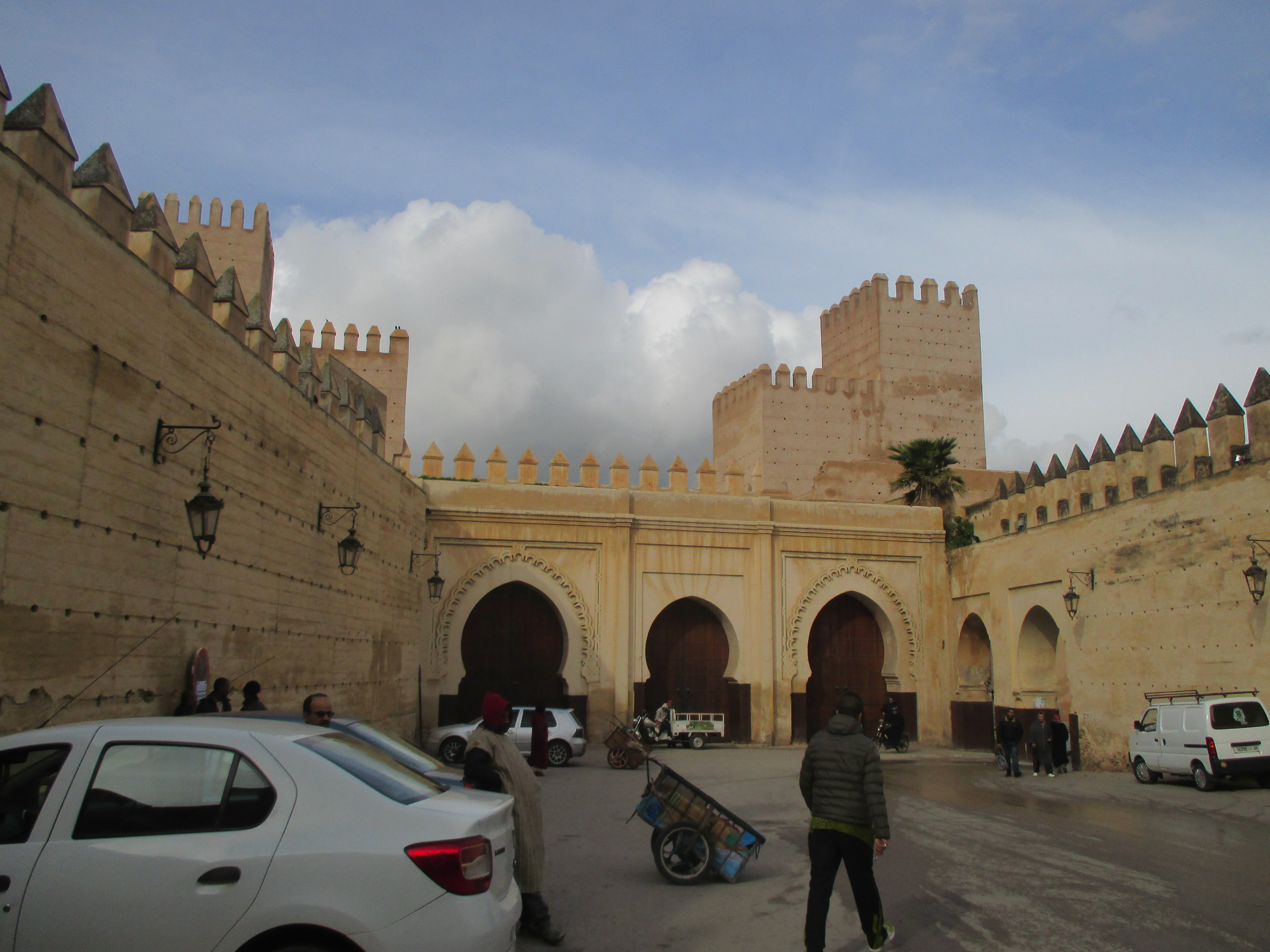
View of the Old Mechouar, looking north to the inner side of Bab Dekkakin

The smallest of the mechouars of Fes, this courtyard immediately precedes the official entrance to the Dar al-Makhzen. The mechouar is enclosed by ramparts on all sides and dates to the Marinid period. It appears that it was originally a fortified bridge over the Oued Fes (Fez River), with fortified gates at either end. The river still passes underneath the square, reemerging via four semi-circular openings at the eastern base of its walls on the edge of the Jnan Sbil Gardens.

On the southern side of the square today is the gate to the Dar al-Makhzen; until the creation of the new palace gates in the southwest, this was the main entrance to the palace. However, this was originally occupied by a gate called Bab al-Qantara ("Gate of the Bridge") or Bab el-Oued ("Gate of the River") which had been the northern entrance to the whole city before the palace grounds were expanded and it became the gate to the Dar al-Makhzen itself. On the square's northern side is Bab Dekkakin (originally called Bab es-Sebaa), the monumental gate leading to and from the New Mechouar (see below). To the west, an opening in the walls leads to the Moulay Abdallah residential district of Fes el-Jdid. On the square's east side are two other openings in the wall. The southern one leads to the Grande Rue (main street) of Fes el-Jdid (which leads to Bab Semmarine and the Jewish Mellah beyond), while the northern opening gives access to the road leading towards Place Bou Jeloud and the entrance to Fes el Bali. Because of this crossroads, the mechouar is one of the busiest squares in Fes el-Jdid today.

==== New Mechouar (Nouveau Méchouar) ====
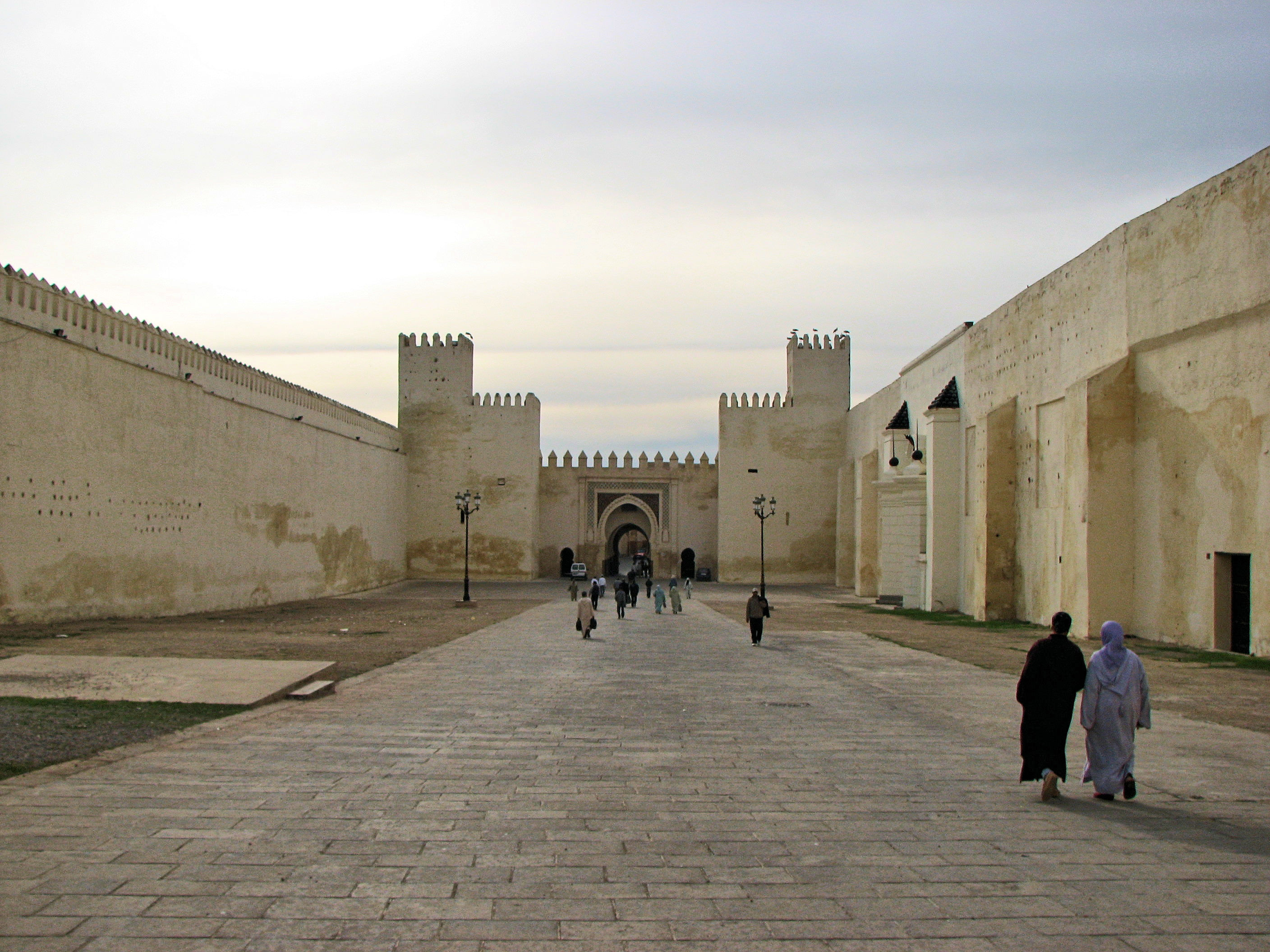
The New Mechouar, looking south towards Bab Dekkakin

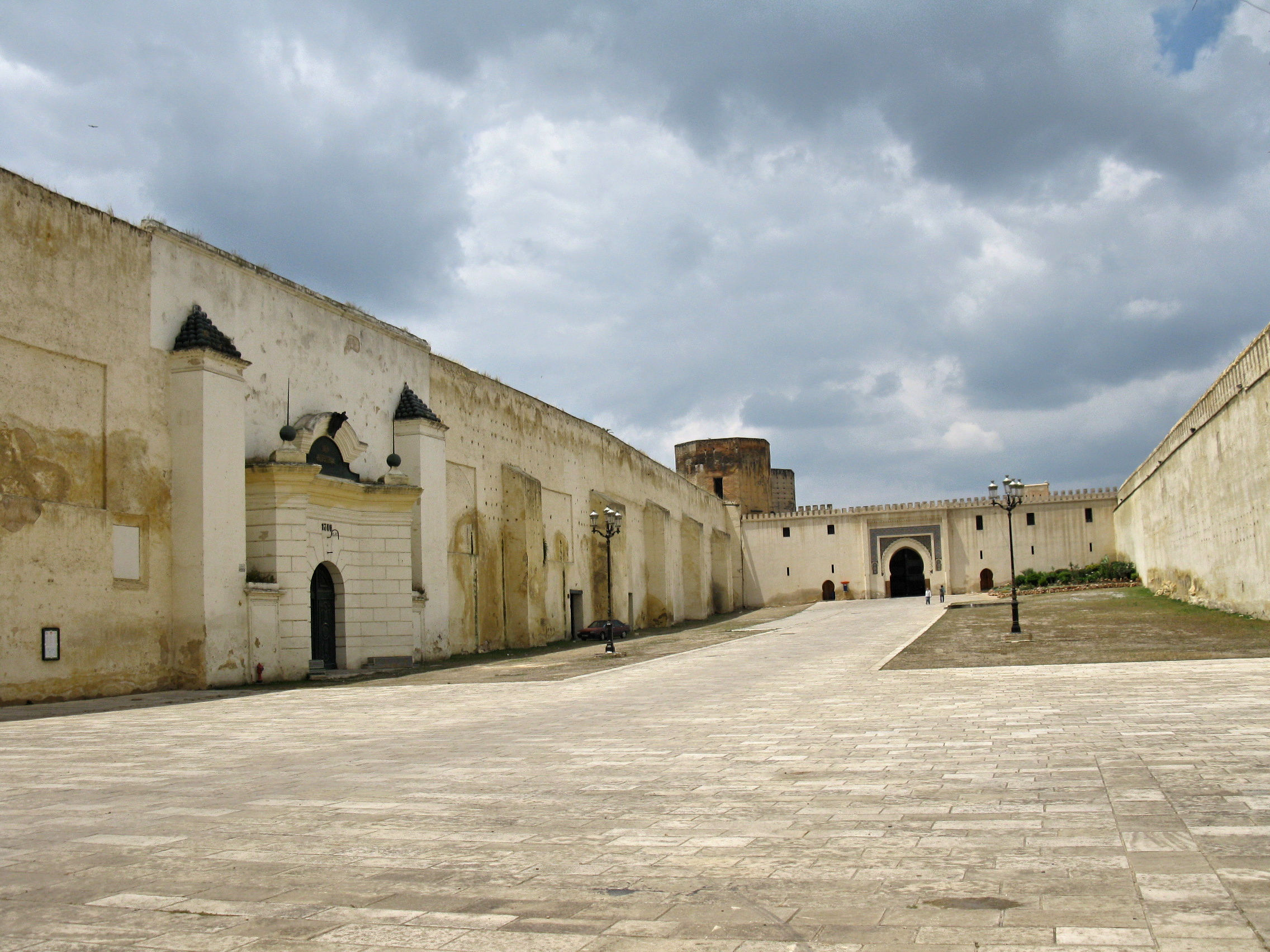
The New Mechouar, looking north from Bab Dekkakin; the gate of the Dar al-Makina is on the left

To the north of the Old Mechouar, through the monumental Bab Dekkakin ("Gate of the Benches"; also known as Bab es-Sebaa, "Gate of the Lion"), lies the larger New Mechouar. According to scholars, it was created by Sultan Moulay Hassan in the late 19th century.

On the western side of the square is a gateway in the Italianate architectural style which belongs to the Makina (Dar al-Makina), a former arms factory (also called Dar al-Silah) established by Moulay Hassan in 1886 with the help of Italian officers. Originally, though, this western wall was actually a large Marinid aqueduct built in 1286 to carry water to the Mosara Garden in the north; the faint outline of its arches can still be seen today within the structure of the wall. The northern gate of the New Mechouar, known as Bab Kbibat es-Smen ("Gate of the Butter Niche"), also dates from the 1886 construction, though another gate called Bab Segma (formerly part of the Marinid gardens) also lends its name to the area.

==== Bab Bou Jat Mechouar ====
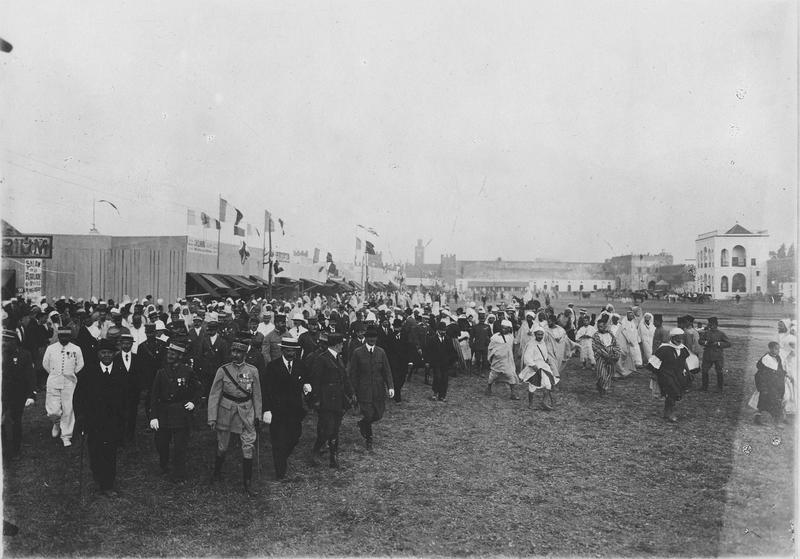
1916 photo showing a fair taking place in the Bab Bou Jat Mechouar. On the far right, in the distance, is the menzeh built by Sultan Abdelaziz (the two-story white structure with arches).

Also known as the "Grand Mechouar", this vast irregular quadrilateral space of 4 hectares occupied the northwestern corner of Fes el Jdid in an angle between the walls of the palace grounds to the south and the Moulay Abdallah district to the east. The military square was laid out in the mid-19th century by Abd al-Rahman de Saulty, a Muslim convert and officer in the military engineers corps under Sultan Moulay Abd al-Rahman (ruled 1822–1859). The creation of the mechouar required a minor diversion of the Oued Fes river at the time. Bab Bou Jat, the main western gate of the Moulday Abdallah quarter, once opened through here but was closed off in the 20th century. On the south side of the square is a menzeh, an elevated pavilion from which the sultan could observe ceremonies taking place in the square, which was built by Sultan Abdelaziz (ruled 1894–1908).

==== Place des Alaouites ====
In the 1960s a new grand square, Place des Alaouites, was laid out on the southwestern side of the palace, near the former Mellah. New ornate gates were constructed here between 1969 and 1971. The gates are considered an excellent piece of modern Moroccan craftsmanship and are lavishly decorated with elaborate mosaic tilework, carved cedar wood, and doors of gilt bronze covered in geometric patterns. These gates, along with the gate at the Old Mechouar, are the closest that most members of the public can get to the palace grounds.

Gates of the Royal Palace at Place des Alaouites

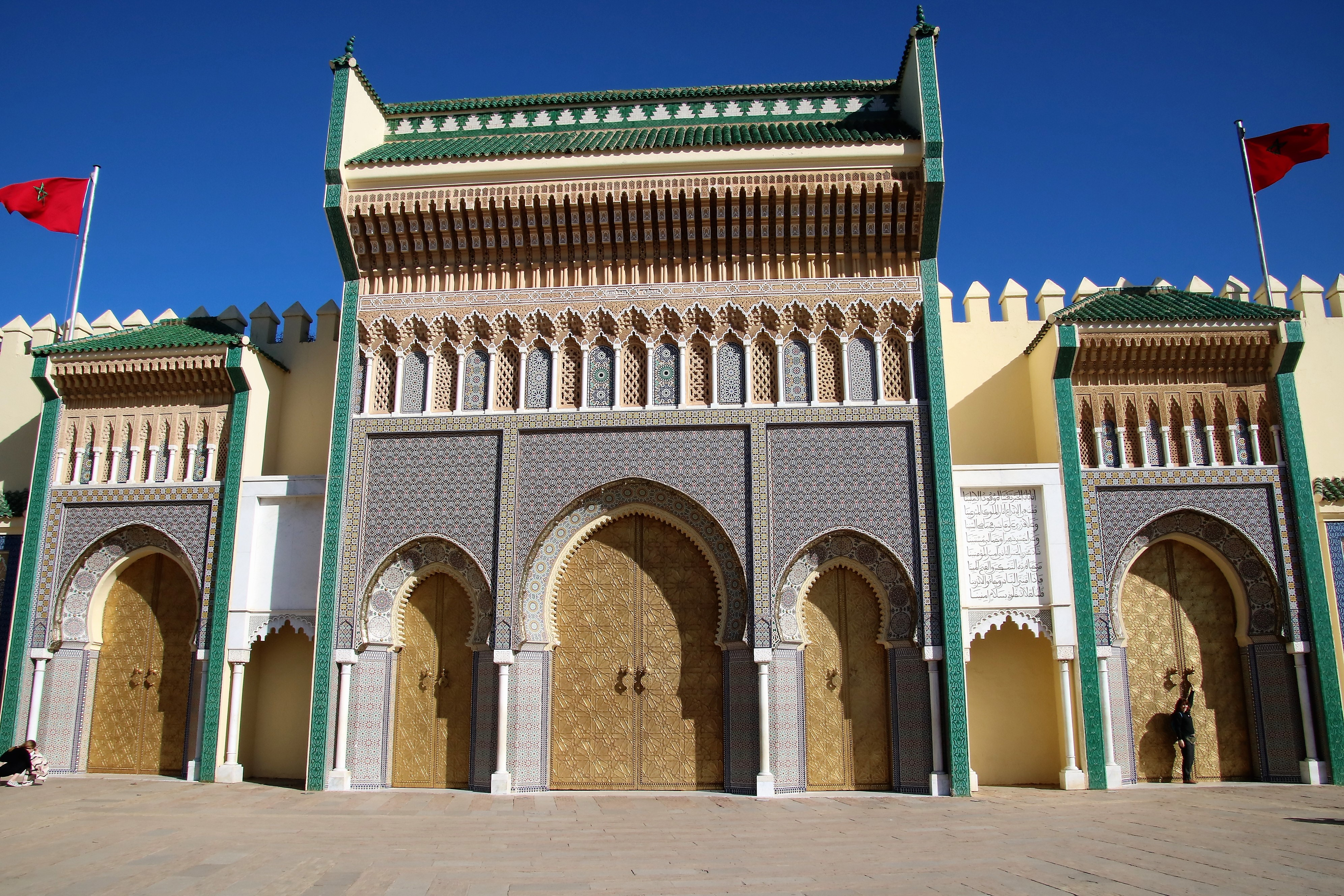
The front gates of the Royal Palace today, dating from 1969 to 1971

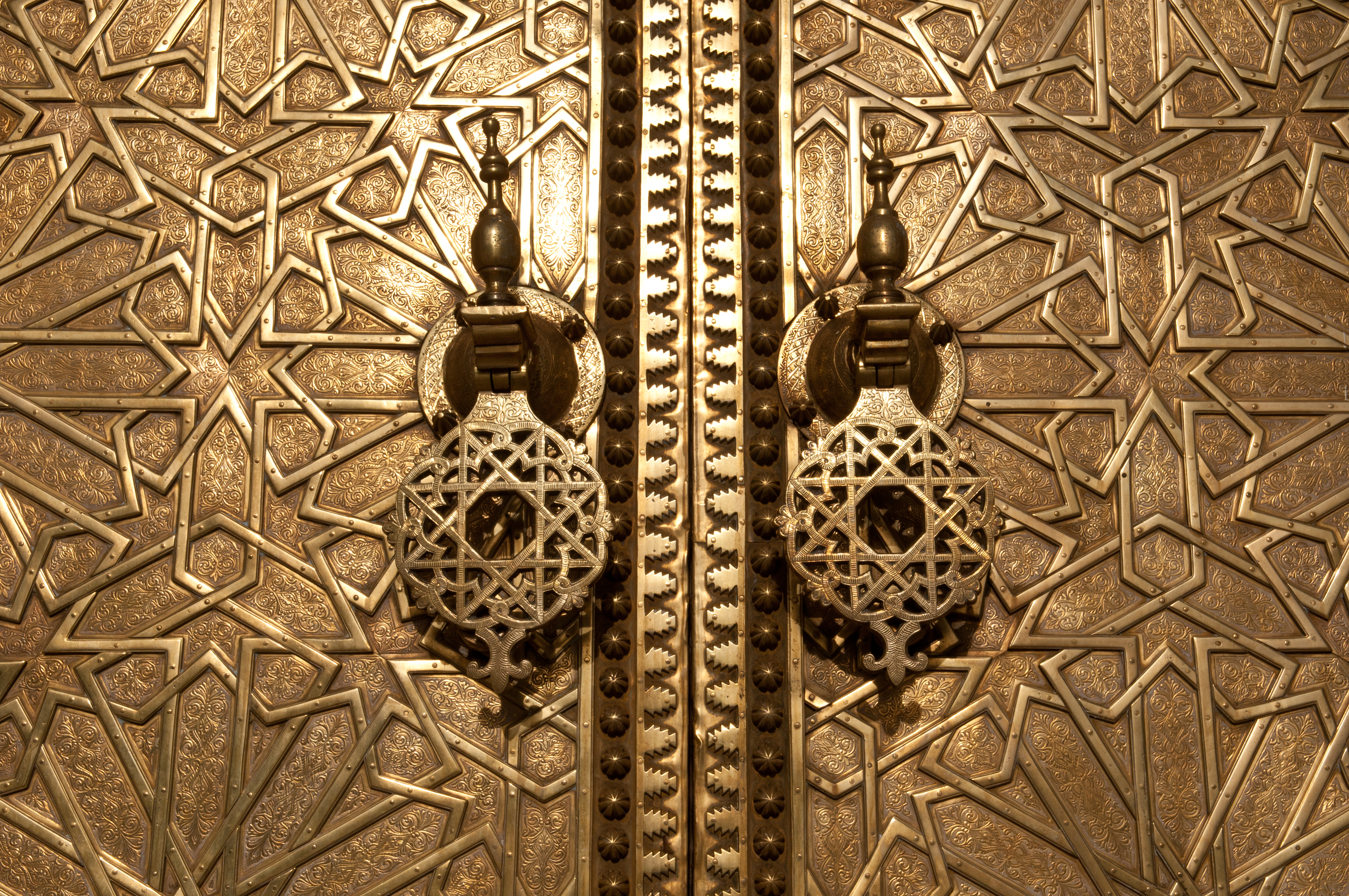
The gilt bronze doors

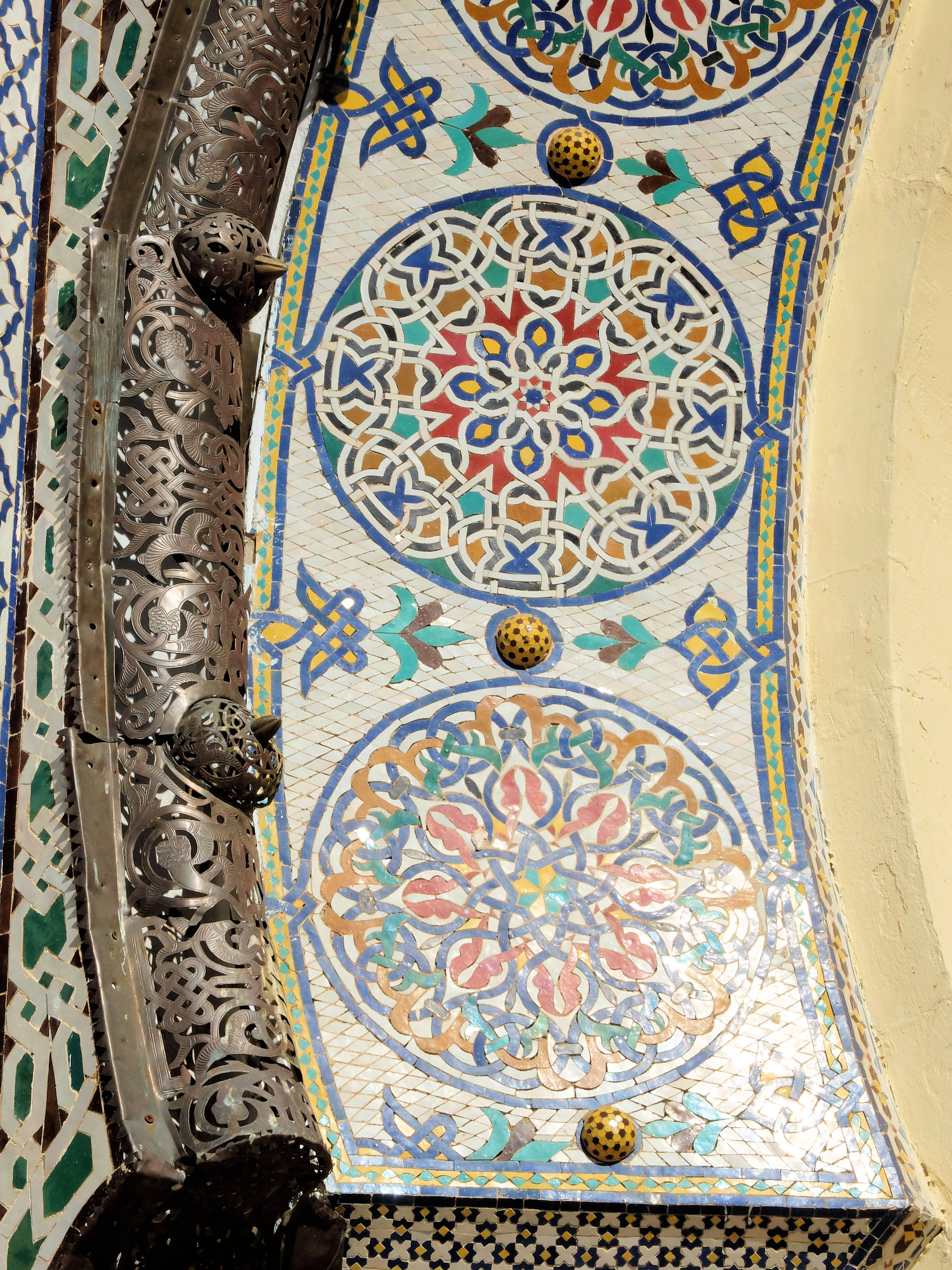
Zellij and metalwork around the doorways

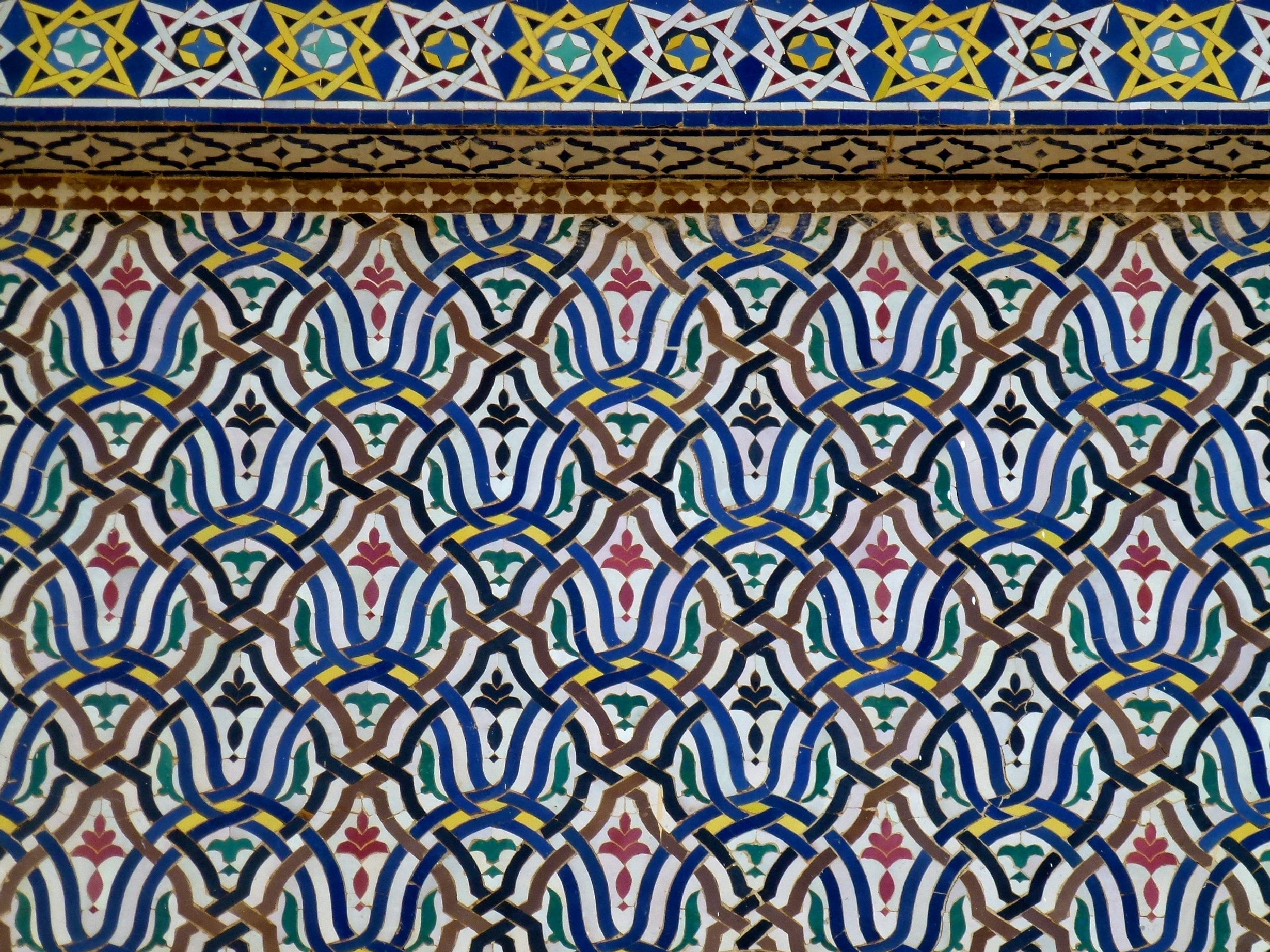
Zellij with darj-wa-ktaf motifs in the upper facade of the gates

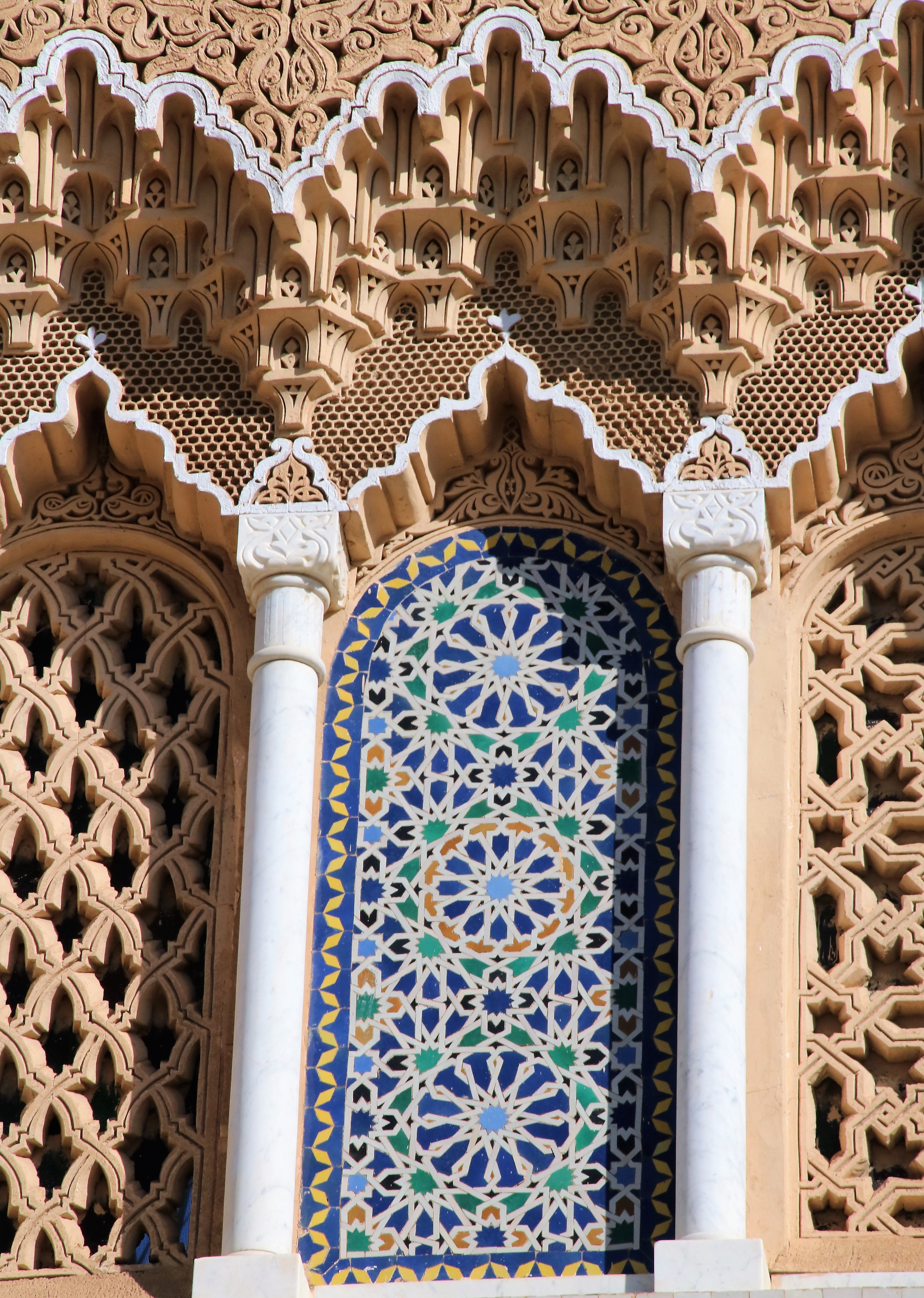
Decorative niches with zellij and carved muqarnas above the gates

=== The grounds of the Royal Palace ===
While today the main front entrance of the palace are its famous gates to the southwest, historically the palace's main public entrance was from the Old Mechouar to the northeast. Upon entering the palace from here, one passed through several courtyards until reaching the "Inner" Mechouar created under Sultan Moulay Hassan. This large rectangular courtyard is paved with marble and lined with arcades. Historically it housed a number of public and administrative functions like the mahkama (courthouse). On the southeast side of the courtyard is a mosque which is in fact the former Marinid Madrasa of Fes el-Jdid, modified and provided with a minaret when Moulay Hassan created this mechouar. The Grand Mosque of Fes el-Jdid, to which it was originally associated, is adjoined to the north side of this courtyard, just outside the royal palace grounds. Traditionally, the sultan was able to travel directly between the mosque and the palace via a connecting passage.

To the west and south of these mechouars was the area which was historically the private residence of the sultan. It consists of a number of patio courtyards, inner gardens, residential pavilions, and other structures. One of the largest elements is the Patio of Moulay Rashid, created in the 17th century, covering a large rectangular area on the east side of the palace. The courtyard is arranged around a rectangular water basin at its middle, and at its southeastern end is a small pavilion chamber preceded by a portico supported by white marble columns topped with elegant capitals. It was cited by a couple of outside visitors in the early 20th century as one of the more beautiful spaces of the palace, with one visitor claiming that Sultan Moulay Abd al-Hafid once had a small boat set to float around its central pool. The same sultan also began construction of a tall building in the courtyard's northwestern corner with the intention of installing the palace's first elevators in it, but the structure was left unfinished for many years after his reign. The Dar al-Makhzen also had its own library, located near the Bab Bou Jat Mechouar, which was created by Sultan Moulay Abd ar-Rahman and further developed by Sultan Moulay Hassan.

Further southwest from these central structures is a large park or garden known as the Lalla Mina Gardens. The gardens, along with the Lalla Mina Mosque near its northeastern corner (not far from the present-day palace gates and marked with a minaret), were created by Sultan Moulay Abd ar-Rahman in the 19th century on the site of the former "Agdal" gardens of the Marinid period. On the northeastern side of the gardens, next to the mosque, is another large courtyard and a palace pavilion at its northwestern end which were created by Moulay Abdelaziz (1894–1908). Near the eastern corner of the gardens, on the south side of the mosque, is a large square courtyard which was once the menagerie of the palace, holding lions and other wild animals, but is now adjoined by the new main gates of the palace. Along the western edge of the gardens runs a set of double fortified walls which were the original Marinid western walls of Fes el-Jdid, as well as the original western gate known as Bab Agdal. Beyond these, further west and covering an even larger area, are the current Agdal Gardens which were originally established by Sultan Moulay Hassan.

Views of Royal Palace courtyards and structures

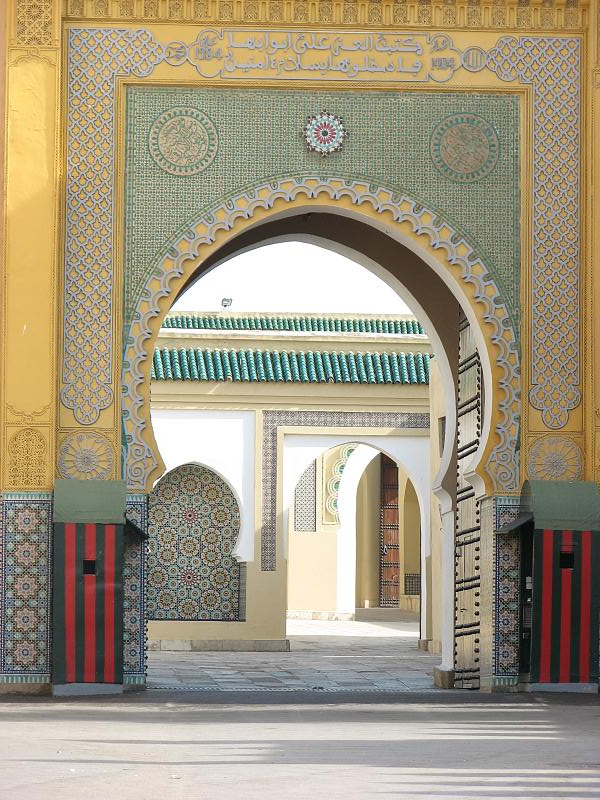
The entrance to the Dar al-Makhzen at the Old Mechouar today; the courtyard and passages behind it lead to the Inner Mechouar

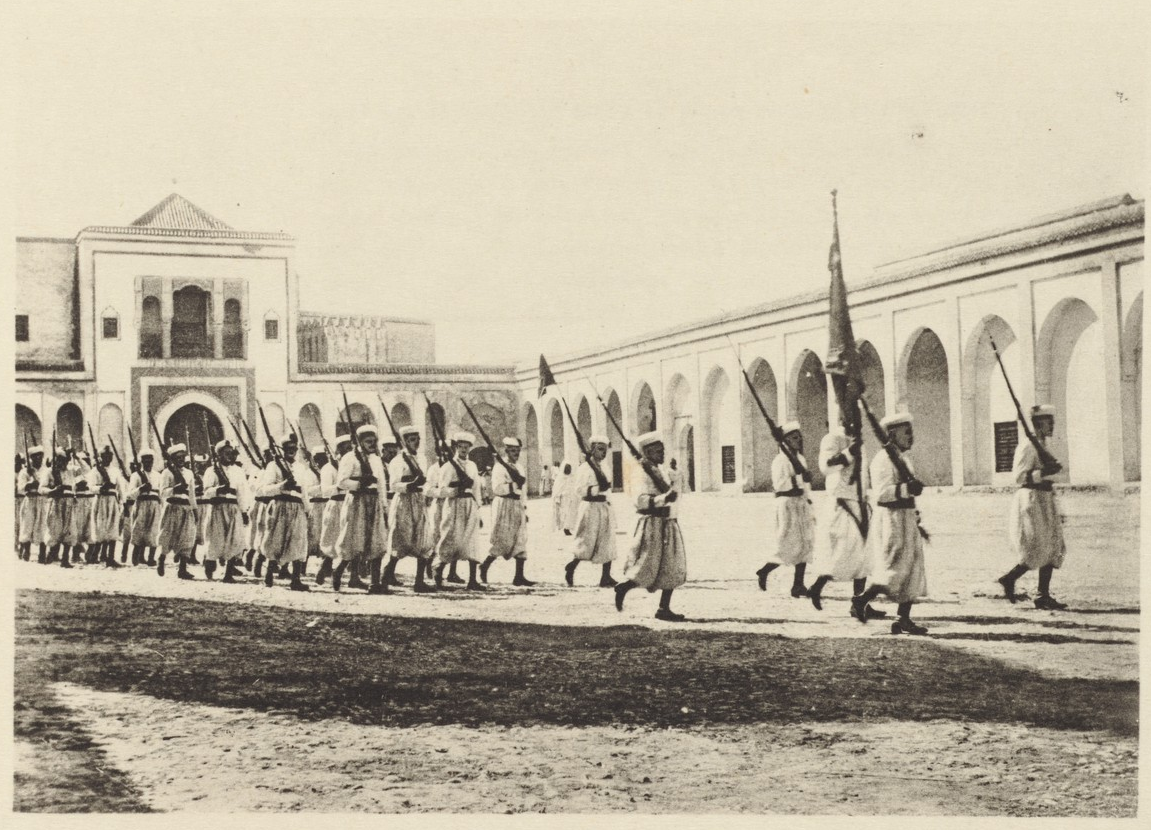
The Inner Mechouar, a vast internal courtyard in what was historically the administrative section of the palace (photo from 1922)

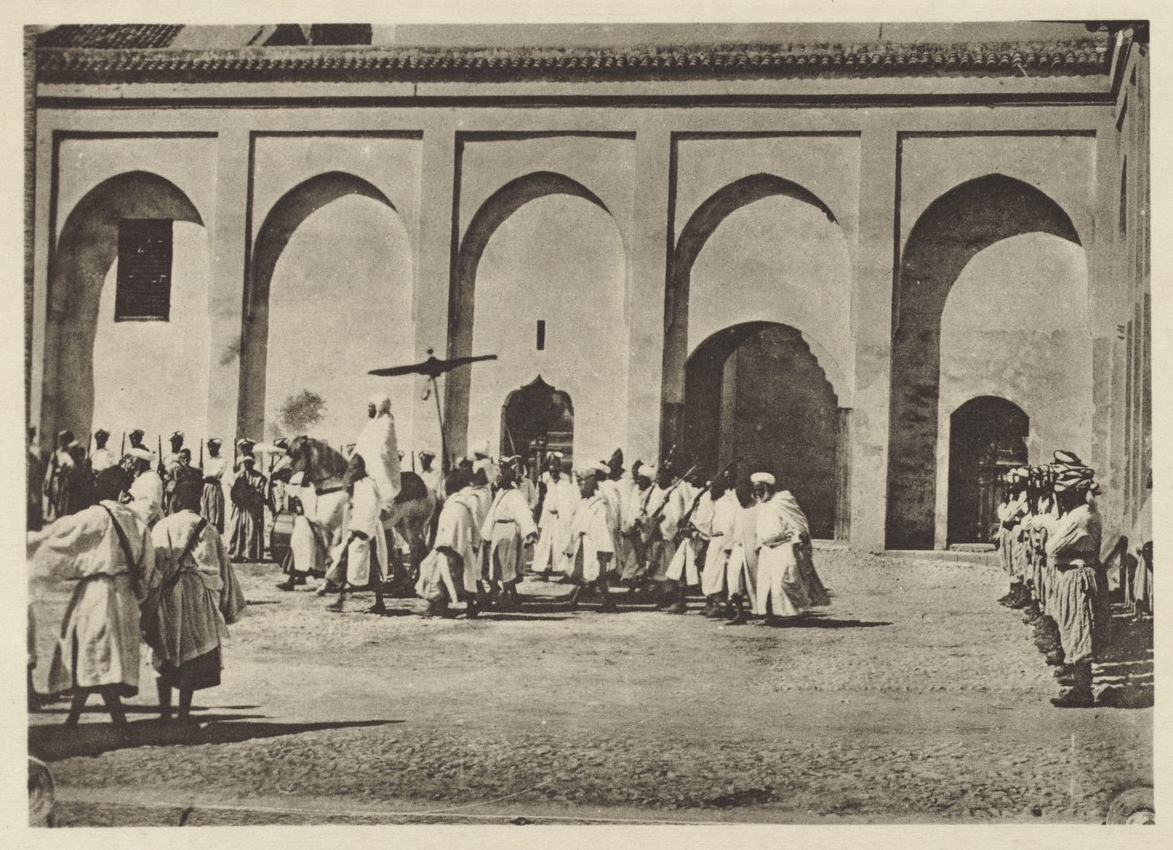
1922 photo showing the sultan in the Inner Mechouar, returning from prayers at the Great Mosque of Fes el-Jdid which was directly connected to the palace

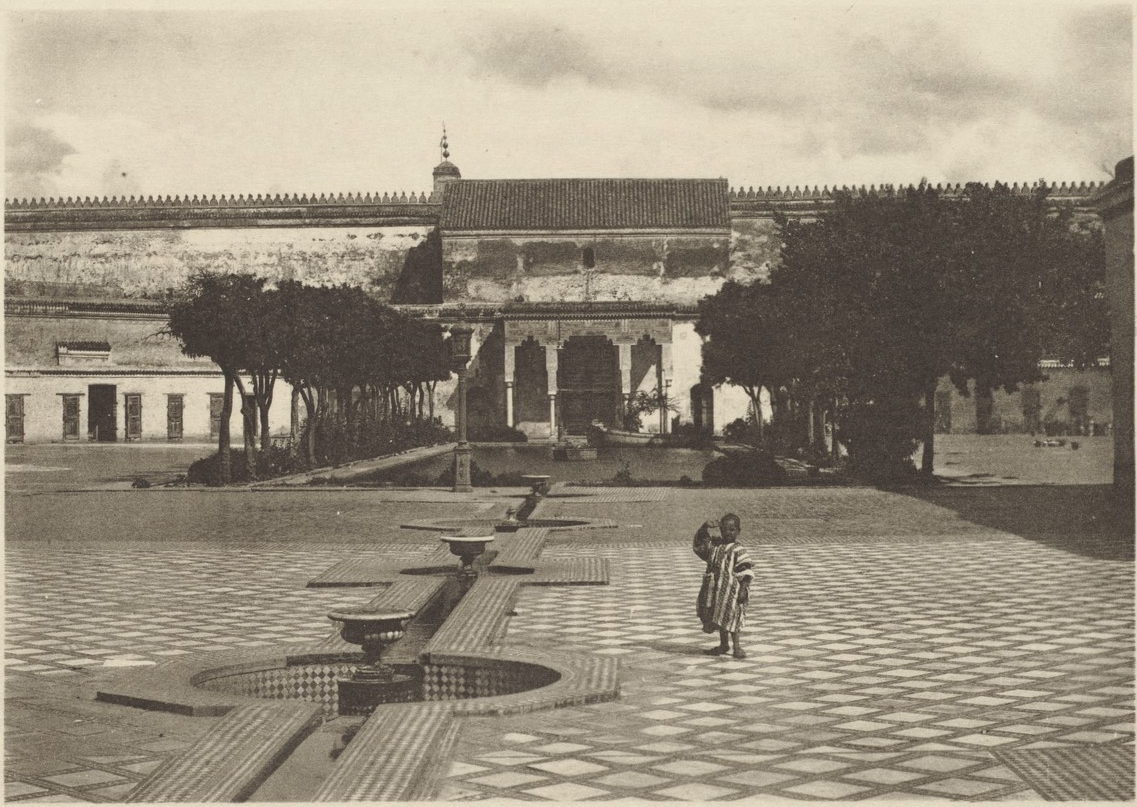
The vast patio courtyard of Moulay Rashid, dating from 1670 (photo from 1922)

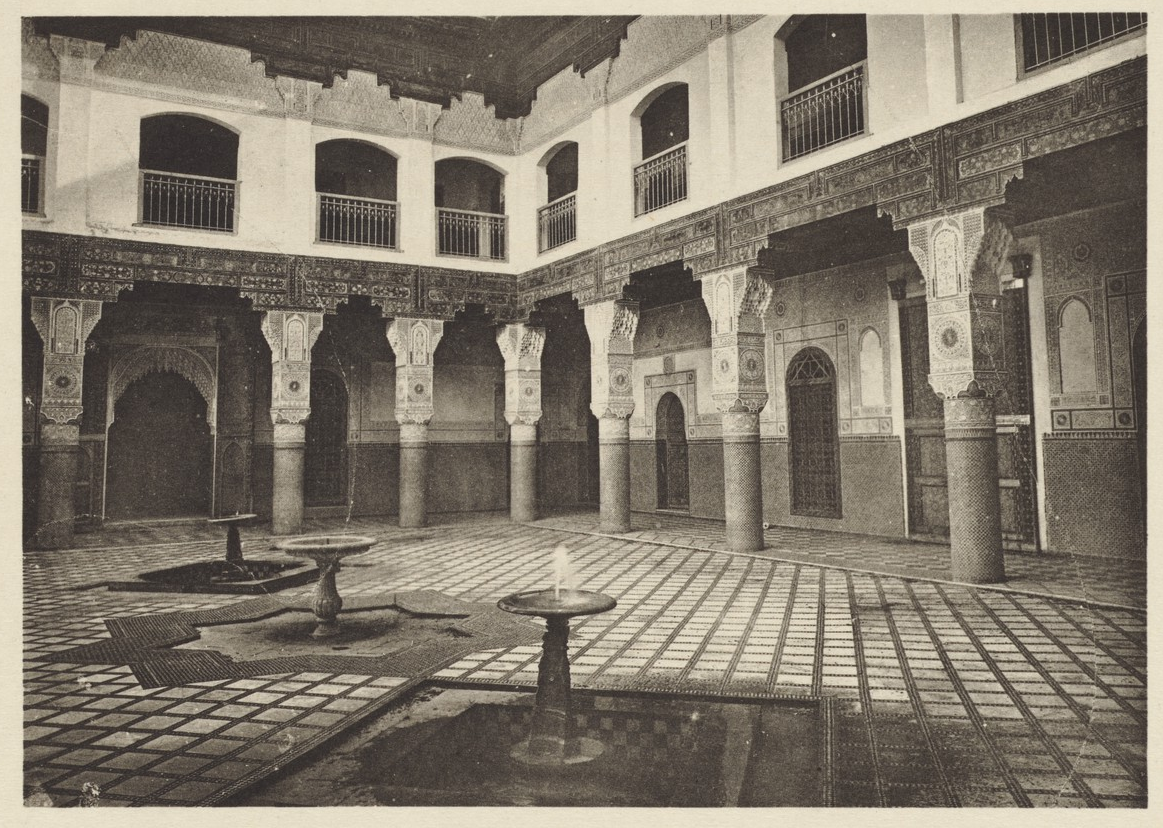
Interior of a lavish palace pavilion constructed in the first years of the 20th century, with traditional decoration (photo from 1922)

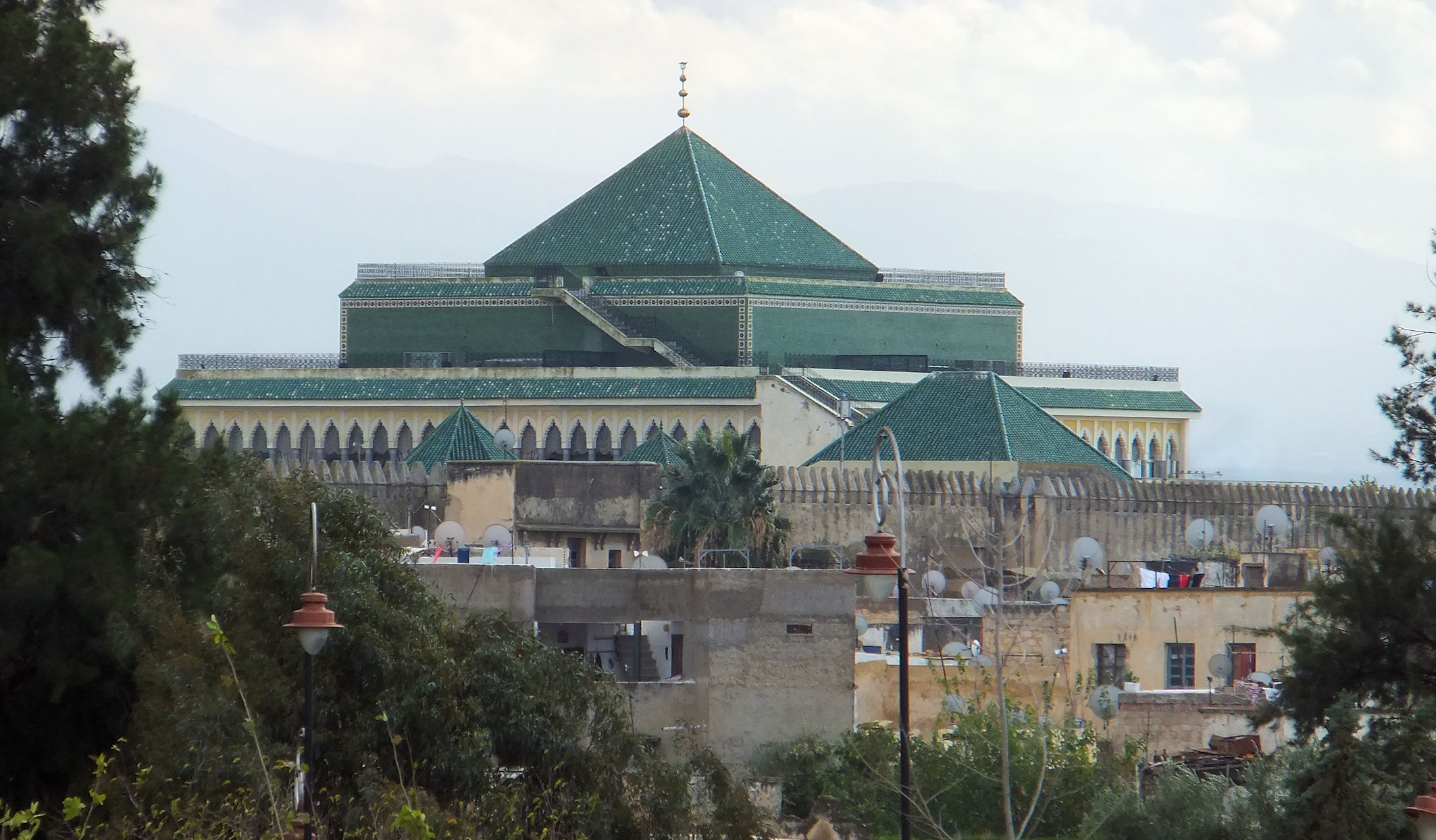
View from afar of a large structure in the Royal Palace today

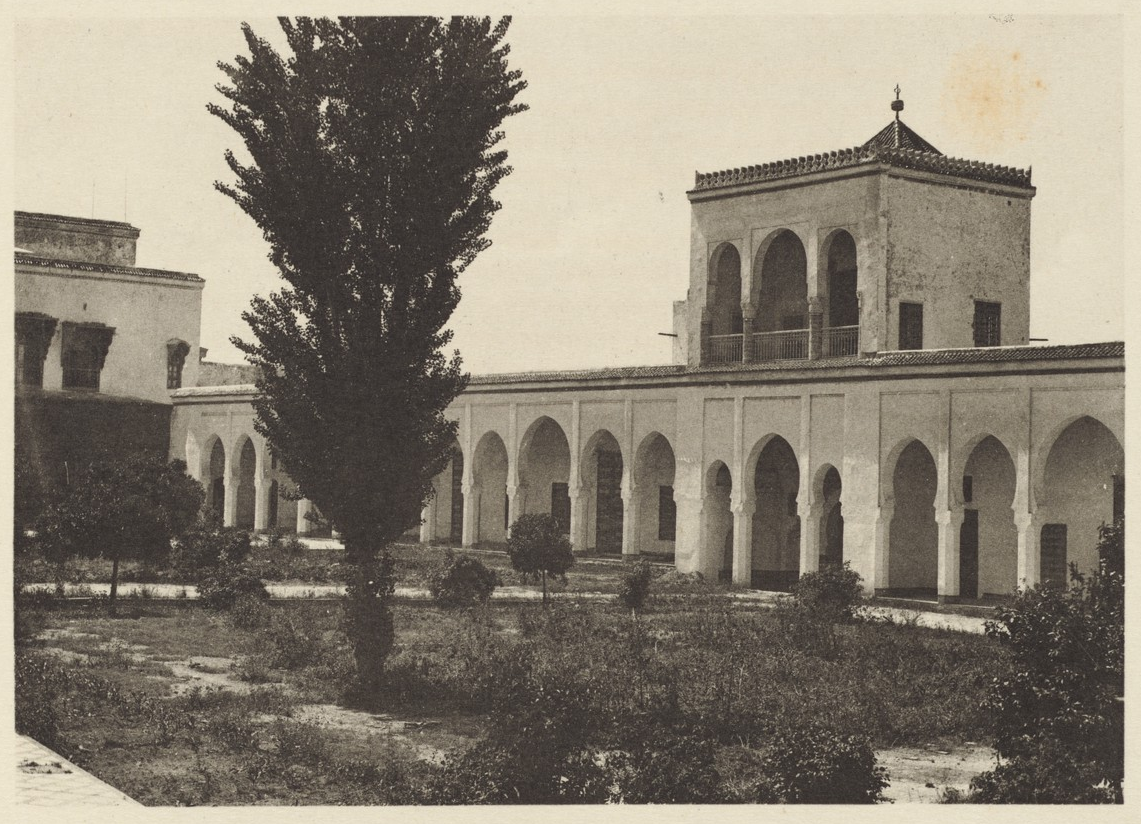
Courtyard and interior garden created by Moulay Abdelaziz (between 1894 and 1908), located near the Lalla Mina Mosque and Gardens (photo from 1922)

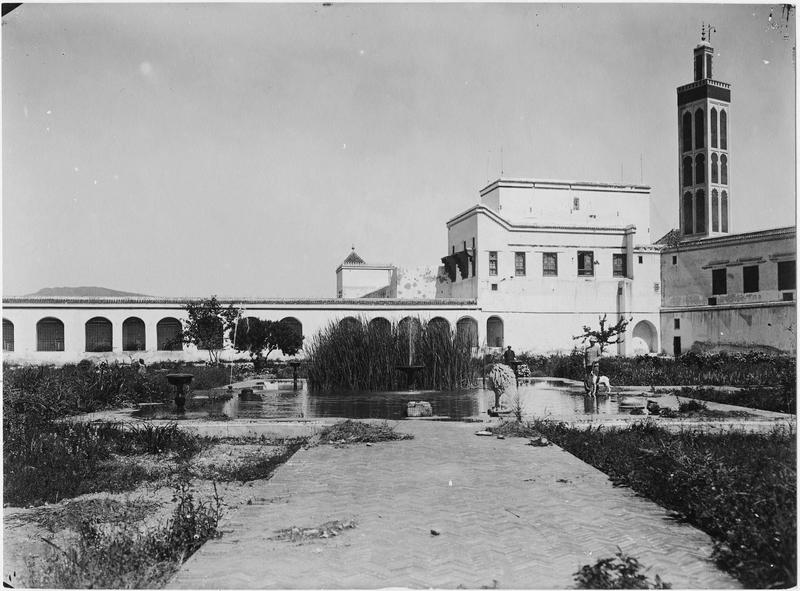
View of the menagerie courtyard in the southwestern corner of the palace, looking north, with the minaret of the Lalla Mina Mosque on the right (photo from 1913)

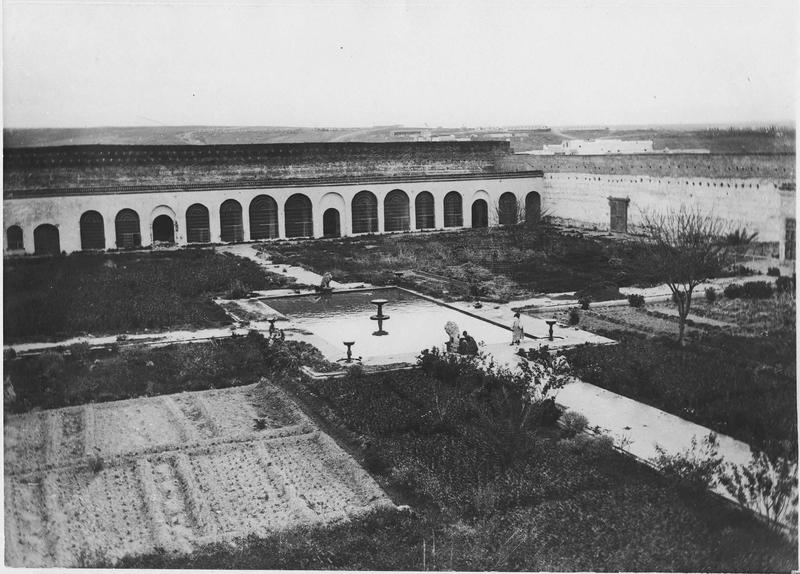
Another view of the menagerie courtyard, looking southwest; the arches along the far wall held cages for lions or other animals (photo from 1913)

== See also ==
- Fortifications of Fez
- List of Moroccan royal residences
