= Iron Gate =

Iron Gate, or Iron Gates may refer to:

- Gates of Alexander, iron gates built by Alexander the Great
- Iron Gates (Algeria), a pass through the Bibans mountains in Algeria
- Iron Gate (Antioch), a sixth-century dam built above the city of Antioch
- Iron Gate Pass of Transylvania, Southern Carpathians, Romania
- Iron Gate Pass, a gorge in central Xinjiang, People's Republic of China
- Iron Gate (Central Asia), a defile between Balkh and Samarkand
- Iron Gates is a gorge on the Danube River, forming part of the boundary between Serbia and Romania
- Iron Gate (Diocletian's Palace)
- Iron-Gate Square (Warsaw)
- Iron Gate, Virginia, a small town located in Alleghany County, Virginia
- Iron Gate I Hydroelectric Power Station (Romania, Serbia)
- Iron Gate II Hydroelectric Power Station (Romania, Serbia)
- Iron Gate III Hydroelectric Power Station (Serbia)
- Iron Gate Dam (disambiguation)
  - Iron Gate Dam (California), a dam in California that was removed in 2024
- Iron Gates, a book by Joshua Caleb Sutter
- Iron Gate, one of the Gates of the Temple Mount
- Iron Gates, a section of Samariá Gorge, Crete
- Cairo Station, a 1958 Egyptian film also known as The Iron Gate
- Iron Gate AB, the developer of the video game Valheim
- Żelazna Brama (neighbourhood) (Iron-Gate), a neighbourhood in Warsaw, Poland

== See also ==
- Bab al-Hadid (disambiguation) ("Iron Gate" in Arabic)
- Puerta de Hierro (disambiguation) ("Iron Gate" in Spanish)
- Derbent (disambiguation), settlements given the name Iron Gate from Persian word Darband
