= Bab al-Hadid (disambiguation) =

Bab al-Hadid, lit. 'the Iron Gate', ia one of the historical gates of the Ancient City of Aleppo, Syria.

Bab al-Hadid or Bab el-Hadid may also refer to:

- The Iron Gate (Antioch), a 6th-century dam east of present-day Antakya, Turkey
- Bab al-Hadid, one of the gates of the Temple Mount
- Bab el-Hadid, one of the gates of Fes el-Bali and part of the fortifications of Fez
- Cairo Station, a 1958 Egyptian crime-drama film, also known by its Arabic title Bāb al-Ḥadīd
- Derbent, historically known in Arabic as Bāb al-Ḥadīd
- Ramses Station, a railway station of Cairo, Egypt, also popularly known as Bāb al-Ḥadīd in Arabic

== See also ==
- Iron gate (disambiguation)
