= Puerta de Hierro =

Puerta de Hierro means "Iron Gate" in Spanish. It may mean:

- Puerta de Hierro, Guadalajara
- Puerta de Hierro (Madrid)
- The Argentine film Puerta de Hierro, el exilio de Perón

== See also ==
- Iron Gate (disambiguation)
