= Iron Gate Dam =

Iron Gate Dam may refer to:

- Iron Gate I Dam, on the Danube River between Romania and Serbia
- Iron Gate II Dam, on the Danube River between Romania and Serbia
- Iron Gate III Dam, a proposed power station
- Iron Gate Dam (California), a former dam on the Klamath River in the United States
