= List of monuments in Fez =

This is a list of monuments that are classified by the Moroccan ministry of culture around Fez, Morocco.

== Monuments and sites in Fez ==
Image		Name	Location	Coordinates	Identifier
	Upload Photo	Bab el-Semarine	Fez	34°3'15.01"N, 4°59'24.00"W	pc_architecture/sanae:390038
	Upload Photo	Kasbah of Cherarda	Fez	34°3'45.00"N, 4°59'29.00"W	pc_architecture/sanae:190001
	Upload Photo	Medersa Al Mesbahia	Fez	34°3'54.7"N, 4°58'23.5"W	pc_architecture/sanae:270004
	Upload Photo	Bab Lhadid	Fez	34°3'28"N, 4°58'37"W	pc_architecture/sanae:390045
	Upload Photo	Bab el Khokha (Fez)	Fez	34°3'38"N, 4°57'59"W	pc_architecture/sanae:390085
	Upload Photo	Bab Dekkakin	Fez	34°3'31.2"N, 4°59'28.9"W	pc_architecture/sanae:390001
	Upload Photo	Bab Ftouh	Fez	34°3'N, 4°59'W	pc_architecture/sanae:390042
	Upload Photo	Bab Mahrouk	Fez	34°3'45.382"N, 4°59'8.254"W	pc_architecture/sanae:390046
	Upload Photo	Seffarin Madrasa	Fez	34°3'50.95"N, 4°58'21.26"W	pc_architecture/sanae:270006
	Upload Photo	Bab Chorfa	Fez	34°3'43.99"N, 4°59'8.02"W	pc_architecture/sanae:390087
	Upload Photo	Bab al-Amer	Fez	34°3'5.159"N, 4°59'38.900"W	pc_architecture/sanae:390039
	Upload Photo	Bab El Hamra	Fez	34°3'37.012"N, 4°58'12.936"W	pc_architecture/sanae:390049
	Upload Photo	Bab Segma	Fez	34°3'36"N, 4°59'33"W	pc_architecture/sanae:390047
	Upload Photo	Bab Guissa	Fez	34°4'8.314"N, 4°58'32.844"W	pc_architecture/sanae:390040
	Upload Photo	Bab Sidi Boujida	Fez	34°4'4.616"N, 4°58'0.473"W	pc_architecture/sanae:390041
	Upload Photo	Medina of Fez	Fez	34°3'40"N, 4°58'40"W	pc_architecture/sanae:280008
	Upload Photo	Cherratine Madrasa	Fez	34°3'50.5"N, 4°58'26.0"W	pc_architecture/sanae:270002
	Upload Photo	El-Jamai Palace	Fez	34°4'9"N, 4°58'27"W	pc_architecture/sanae:320060
	Upload Photo	Bab Bou Jeloud	Fez	34°3'42.091"N, 4°59'2.504"W	pc_architecture/sanae:390002
	Upload Photo	Borj Nord	Fez	34°4'1.844"N, 4°59'5.705"W	pc_architecture/sanae:050030
	Upload Photo	Bou Inania Madrasa	Fez	34°3'43.949"N, 4°58'57.839"W	pc_architecture/sanae:270005
	Upload Photo	Dar Batha	Fez	34°3'38.1"N, 4°58'57.8"W	pc_architecture/sanae:180046
	Upload Photo	Ibn Danan Synagogue	Fez	34°3'9.659"N, 4°59'30.070"W	pc_architecture/sanae:560001
	Upload Photo	Al-Attarine Madrasa	Fez	34°3'54.5"N, 4°58'25.0"W	pc_architecture/sanae:270001
	Upload Photo	Sahrij Madrasa	Fez	34°3'46.840"N, 4°58'7.234"W	pc_architecture/sanae:270003
	Upload Photo	Sla de Rebbi Abou Synagogue	Fez	34°3'11.876"N, 4°59'27.060"W	pc_architecture/sanae:560015
	Upload Photo	Sba'iyyin Madrasa	Fez	34°3'46.5"N, 4°58'6.4"W	pc_architecture/sanae:270018
	Upload Photo	the home of Molay Driss Ben Abd-El-Hadj Belghit	Fez		pc_architecture/sanae:320067
	Upload Photo	the Home El-Qadi El-Iraqi	Fez		pc_architecture/sanae:320063
	Upload Photo	Foundouk Maamel Lekhcheb	Fez		pc_architecture/sanae:110078
	Upload Photo	Hôtel Massara	Fez		pc_architecture/sanae:110065
	Upload Photo	Mokri Palace	Fez	34°3'38.2"N, 4°58'37.5"W	pc_architecture/sanae:320020
	Upload Photo	Dar Al Sunna Hotel	Fez		pc_architecture/sanae:110031
	Upload Photo	Saadoun Synagogue	Fez		pc_architecture/sanae:560005
	Upload Photo	Bab Jamaï	Fez		pc_architecture/sanae:390084
	Upload Photo	Borj Cheikh Ahmed	Fez	34°3'29.592"N, 4°59'10.374"W	pc_architecture/sanae:050015
	Upload Photo	Southern Tower (Fes)	Fez	34°3'14.515"N, 4°58'11.993"W	pc_architecture/sanae:050031
	Upload Photo	Filala Kasbah	Fez	33°53'10.291"N, 5°32'55.345"W	pc_architecture/sanae:190002
	Upload Photo	New Fez School or Dar Makhzen	Fez		pc_architecture/sanae:270017
	Upload Photo	El Oued Madrasa	Fez		pc_architecture/sanae:270014
	Upload Photo	Medersa EL-karaouine	Fez		pc_architecture/sanae:270015
	Upload Photo	Medersa de Bab Guissa	Fez	34°4'7.846"N, 4°58'32.945"W	pc_architecture/sanae:270016
	Upload Photo	Medersa Al Mohammadia	Fez		pc_architecture/sanae:270035
	Upload Photo	Seqqaïa Nejarine	Fez	34°3'53.37889"N, 4°58'32.73913"W	pc_architecture/sanae:120011
	Upload Photo	Bhalil	Fez	33°51'4.662"N, 4°52'3.432"W	pc_architecture/sanae:520003
	Upload Photo	Bab Jiaf	Fez	34°3'16.052"N, 4°59'15.763"W	pc_architecture/sanae:390048
	Upload Photo	Funduq al-Najjariyyin	Fez	34°3'53.5"N, 4°58'33.1"W	pc_architecture/sanae:110003
	Upload Photo	El Beida Palace	Fez	34°3'30.071"N, 4°58'38.035"W	pc_architecture/sanae:320006
	Upload Photo	Kantara Ben Tato	Fez	34°3'30.179"N, 4°59'28.687"W	pc_architecture/sanae:380009
	Upload Photo	Foundouk Tetouaniyine	Fez	34°3'54.2"N, 4°58'22.4"W	pc_architecture/sanae:110004
	Upload Photo	Bab Ech Chebbak	Fez	34°3'44.017"N, 4°58'46.564"W	pc_architecture/sanae:390043
	Upload Photo	Bab Kasba (Cherarda)	Fez	34°3'43.733"N, 4°59'33.166"W	pc_architecture/sanae:390037
