= Kasbah Tamdert =

Coordinates: 34°03′40.5″N 4°57′48.6″W

Kasbah Tamdert is a fortress and kasbah in Fes, Morocco. It is located near Bab Ftouh in southern Fes el-Bali.

== History ==
The kasbah was built in the 16th century on the orders of the Saadian sultan Muhammad al-Shaykh in 1549. The Saadians, who had their capital at Marrakech, built forts around Fes to keep its population under control as much as for defending it from outside enemies. Kasbah Tamdert was the first of the Saadian fortifications built in the city, consisting of a simple walled enclosure (a kasbah), while years later the Saadians built the heavier fortresses of Borj Nord, Borj Sud, and the bastions on the eastern side of Fes el-Jdid. The name Tamdert was a local Amazigh (Berber) name. The kasbah continued to be used for military purposes up to the 20th century, when it served as the barracks of the sultan's tabors in 1911 and continued to be used as a barracks during the French Protectorate period (1912–1956).
