= Fes el Bali =

Fès El Bali
UNESCO World Heritage Site
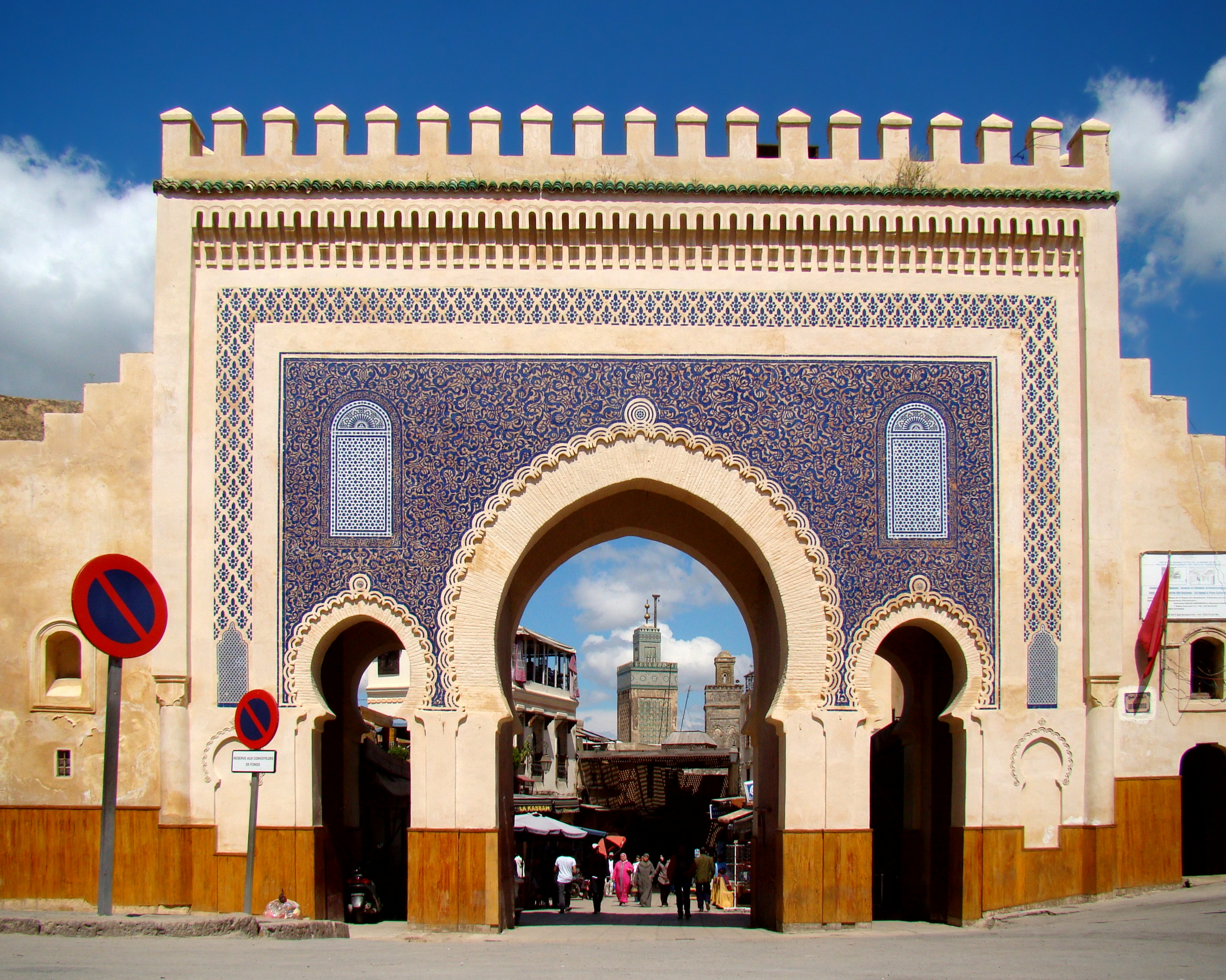
- Bab Bou Jeloud, the main western gate of Fes el Bali

- Location within Morocco Location within Africa
- Location: Fez, Morocco
- Part of: Medina of Fez
- Criteria: Cultural: (ii)(v)
- Reference: 170-001
- Inscription: 1981 (5th Session)
- Area: 2.20 km^{2} (540 acres)
- Coordinates: 34°3′45″N 4°58′21″W

Fes el Bali (Arabic: فاس البالي, romanized: Fās al-Bālī, lit. 'Old Fes') is the oldest part of Fez, Morocco. It is one of the three main districts of Fez, along with Fes Jdid and the French-created Ville Nouvelle ('New City'). Together with Fes Jdid, it forms the medina (historic quarter) of Fez, significant for the preservation of its pre-modern urban layout and numerous historic monuments, which have earned it UNESCO World Heritage Site status.

Fes el Bali was founded as the capital of the Idrisid dynasty between 789 and 808 AD. It was originally composed of two separate towns on either side of the Fez River which subsequently merged under the Almoravids (11th–12th centuries). Even when Marrakesh replaced it as the political capital, it continued to thrive in subsequent centuries thanks to its economic and religious importance. In the 13th century, the Marinid dynasty built Fes Jdid as a new administrative capital next to Fes el Bali.

Fes el Bali district still largely retains much of its historic fabric of market (suq) streets and narrow winding alleys, along with large sections of its historic city walls. At its heart is the historic al-Qarawiyyin University, centered around a mosque founded in the 9th century. Among the other major historic landmarks are the Chouara Tanneries and various mosques, madrasas, hammams, caravanserais and residences that constitute important examples of traditional Moroccan and Moorish architecture.

UNESCO listed Fes el Bali, along with Fes Jdid, as a World Heritage Site in 1981 under the name Medina of Fez. The World Heritage Site includes Fes el Bali's urban fabric and walls as well as a buffer zone outside of the walls that is intended to preserve the visual integrity of the location.

== History ==
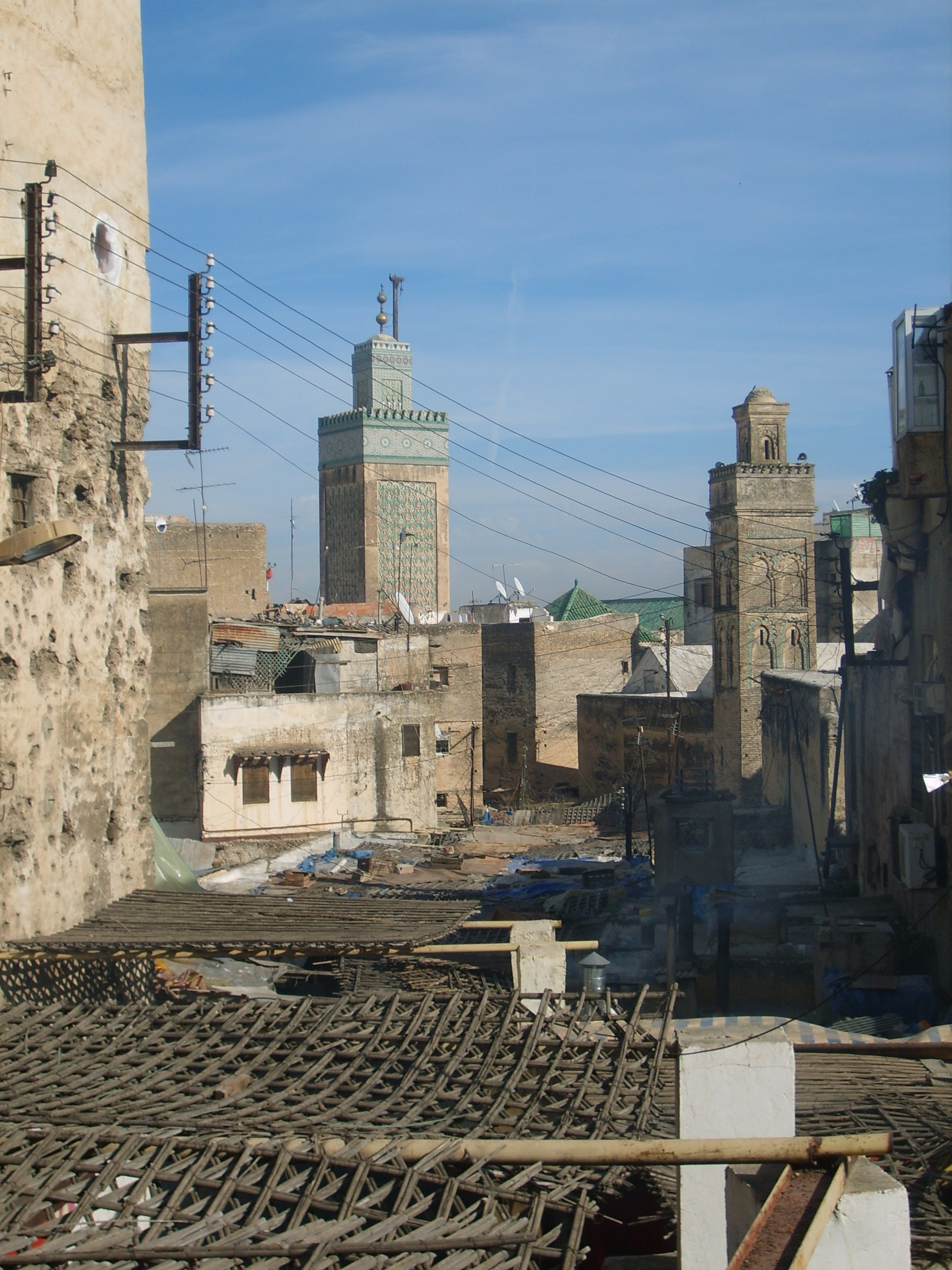
The old medina of Fez. View over Tala'a Kebira street and the minaret of the Bou Inania Madrasa (left) and another mosque (right).

As the capital for his newly acquired empire, Idris ibn Abdallah chose to build a new town on the right bank of the Fez River in AD 789. Many of the first inhabitants were refugees fleeing from an uprising in Cordoba (modern-day Spain). However, in 809 his son, Idris II, decided to found a capital of his own on the opposite bank of the Fez River. Even though they were only separated by a relatively small river the cities developed separately and became two individual cities until they were unified in the 11th century by the Almoravids. There were many refugees who decided to settle in the new city this time too, however this time they fled from an uprising in Kairouan (in modern Tunisia). The University of Al-Karaouine (or al-Qarawiyyin) is recorded by traditional sources as having been founded by one of these refugees, Fatima al-Fihri, in 859. UNESCO and Guinness World Records consider it the oldest continuously operating university in the world. The Al-Andalusiyyin Mosque (or Mosque of the Andalusians), on the opposite shore of the river, is likewise traditionally believed to have been founded by her sister in the same year.

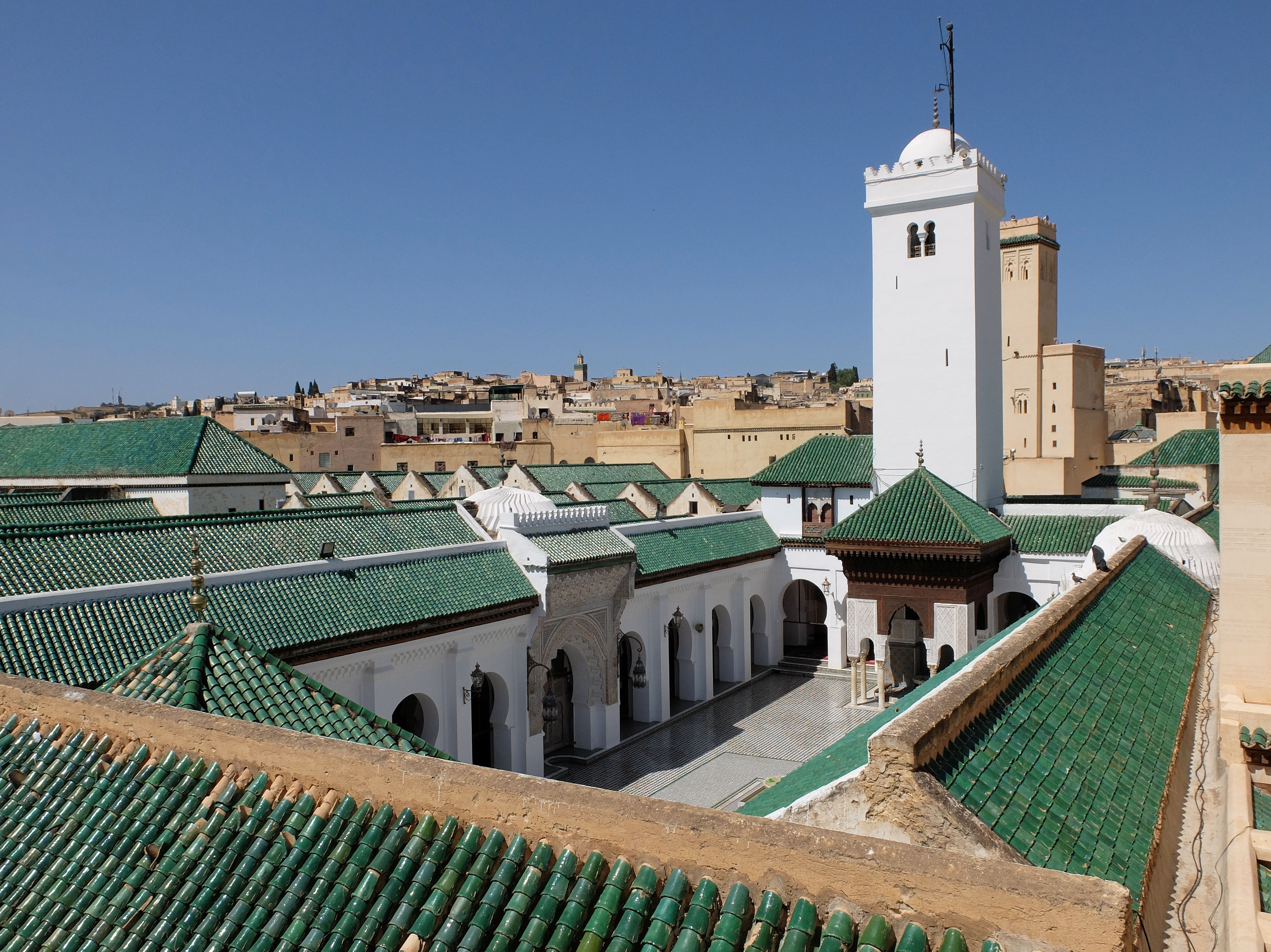
View over the courtyard and minaret of the Qarawiyyin Mosque and University, founded in the 9th century and rebuilt and expanded in later centuries

Under the Almoravids, Fez lost its status as a capital, which was moved to the newly created Marrakesh. During Almohad rule (12th-13th centuries), Fez was a thriving merchant city, even though it was not a capital. It even became the largest city in the world during that time, with approximately 200,000 people living there.

After defeating the Almohads in Morocco, the Marinids moved the capital from Marrakesh back to Fez. This marked the beginning of the greatest period of the history for Fes. When the Marinids moved the capital to Fez in 1276 they started building a new town outside the old city walls. At first it was called Madinat al-Bayda ("the White City"), but it quickly became known as Fes el-Jdid ("New Fez"), while the old city became known as Fes el-Bali ("Old Fez"). The Marinids built the first true madrasas in Morocco, which include many of the city's most notable architectural monuments such as the Bou Inania Madrasa, the Al-Attarin Madrasa, and the Sahrij Madrasa.

The Saadian dynasty (16th and early 17th centuries), who used Marrakesh again as their capital, did not lavish much attention on Fez, with the exception of the ornate ablutions pavilions added to the Qarawiyyin Mosque's courtyard during their time. They built a number of new forts and bastions around the city which appear to have been aimed at keeping control over the local population. They were mostly located on higher ground overlooking Fes el-Bali, from which they would have been easily able to bombard the city with canons. These include the Kasbah Tamdert, just inside the city walls near Bab Ftouh, and the forts of Borj Nord (Borj al-Shamali) on the hills to the north, Borj Sud (Borj al-Janoub) on the hills to the south, and the Borj Sheikh Ahmed to the west, at a point in Fes el-Jdid's walls that was closest to Fes el-Bali. These were built in the late 16th century, mostly by Sultan Ahmad al-Mansur.

It was only when the founder of the Alaouite dynasty, Moulay Rashid, took Fez in 1666 that the city saw a revival again, albeit briefly. He built the Kasbah Cherarda (also known as the Kasbah al-Khemis) to the northwest of Fes el-Jdid to house a large part of his tribal troops. He also restored or rebuilt what became known as the Kasbah an-Nouar, which became the living quarters of his followers from the Tafilalt region (the Alaouite dynasty's ancestral home). For this reason, the kasbah was also known as the Kasbah Filala ("Kasbah of the people from Tafilalt"). Moulay Isma'il, his successor, chose nearby Meknès as his capital instead, but he did restore or rebuild some major monuments in Fes el-Bali, such as the Zawiya of Moulay Idris II. While the succession conflicts between Moulay Isma'il's sons were another low point in the city's history, the city's fortunes rose more definitively after 1757 with the reign of Moulay Muhammad Ibn Abdallah and under his successors.

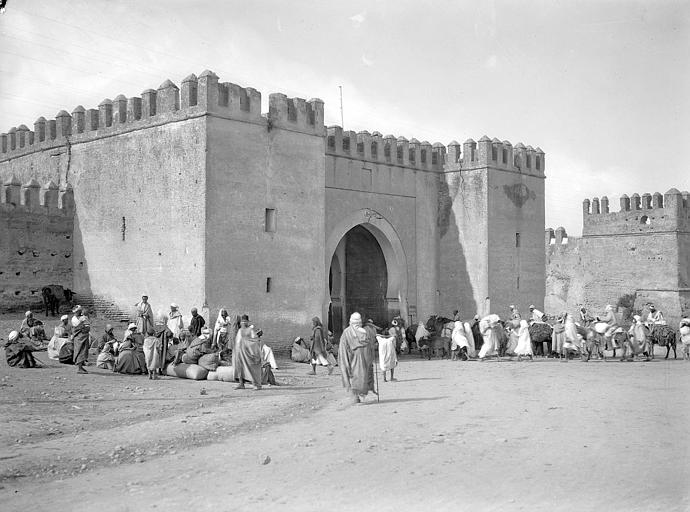
View of Bab Ftouh, the southern gate of the city, in the early 20th century.

The last major change to Fez's topography before the 20th century was made during the reign of Moulay Hasan I (1873-1894), who finally connected Fes el-Jdid and Fes el-Bali by building a walled corridor between them. Within this new corridor, between the two cities, were built new gardens and summer palaces used by the royals and the capital's high society, such as the Jnan Sbil Gardens and the Dar Batha palace.

In 1912 French colonial rule was instituted over Morocco following the Treaty of Fes. Fez ceased to be the center of power in Morocco as the capital was moved to Rabat, which remained the capital even after independence in 1956. Starting under French resident general Hubert Lyautey, one important policy with long-term consequences was the decision to largely forego redevelopment of existing historic walled cities in Morocco and to intentionally preserve them as sites of historic heritage, still known today as "medinas". Instead, the French administration built new modern cities (the Villes Nouvelles) just outside the old cities, where European settlers largely resided with modern Western-style amenities. The existence today of a Ville Nouvelle ("New City") alongside a historic medina of Fez was thus a consequence of this early colonial decision-making and had a wider impact on the entire city's development. While new colonial policies preserved historic monuments, it also had other consequences in the long-term by stalling urban development in these heritage areas. Wealthy and bourgeois Moroccans started moving into the more modern Ville Nouvelles during the interwar period. By contrast, the old city (medina) of Fez was increasingly settled by poorer rural migrants from the countryside.

Today Fes el-Bali and the larger historic medina is a major tourism destination due to its historical heritage. In recent years efforts have been underway to restore and rehabilitate its historic fabric, ranging from restorations of individual monuments to attempts to rehabilitate the Fez River.

== Geography and layout ==
=== Urban structure ===
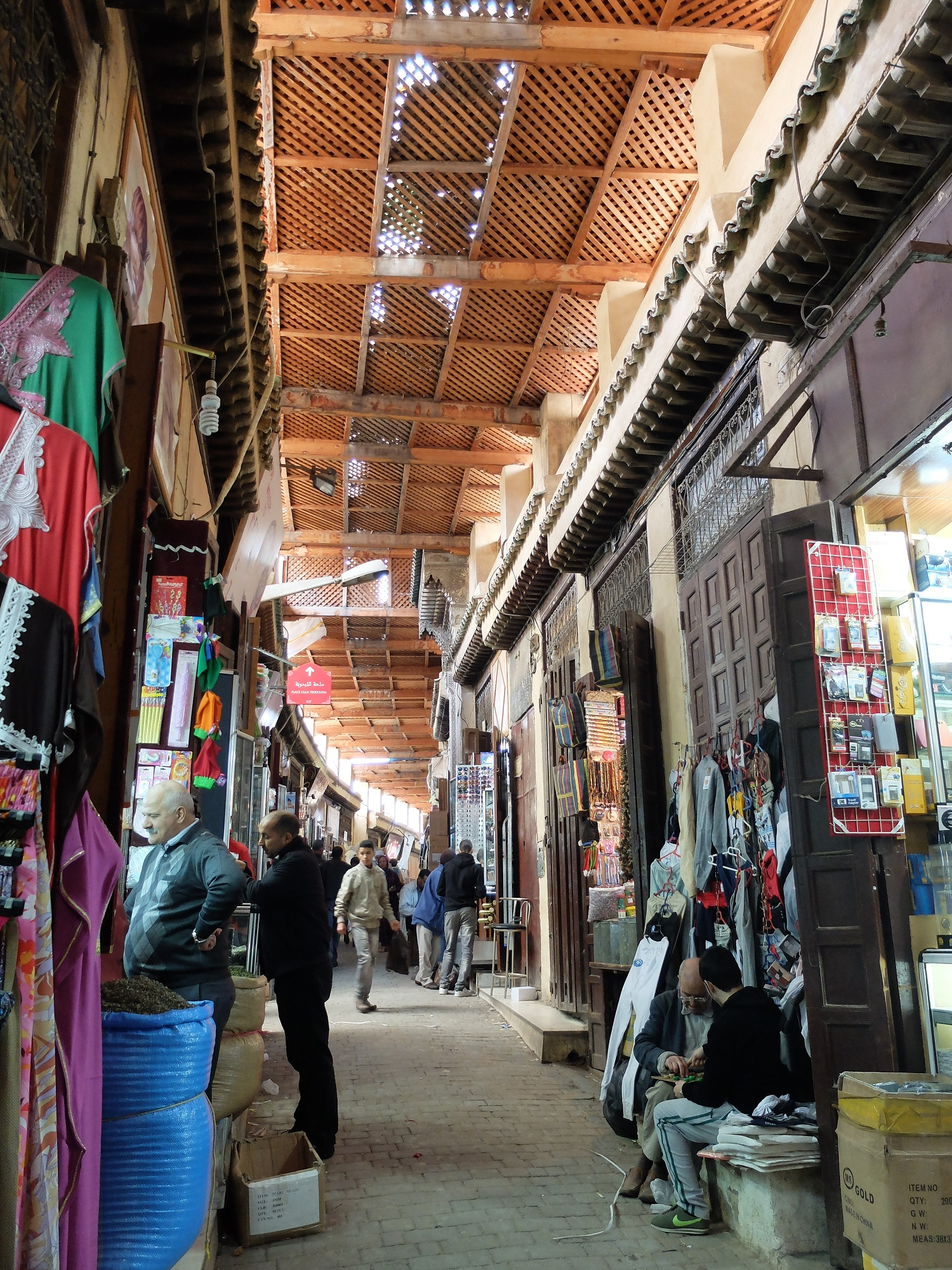
Tala'a Kebira, the longest and one of the most important streets, runs between the western entrance of the city and the Al-Qarawiyyin area at its center. It hosts various souks and shops along much of its length.

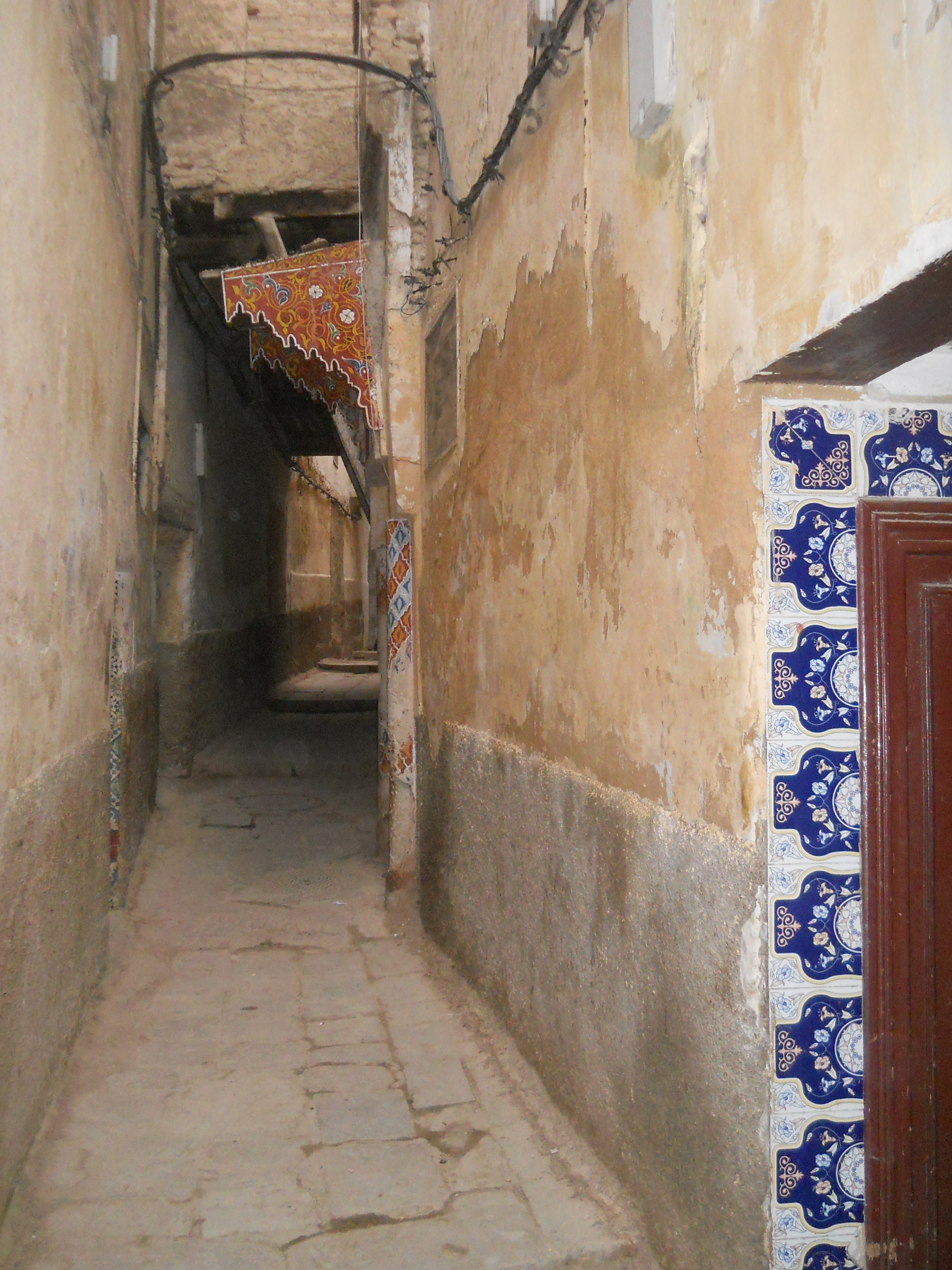
Smaller local streets, by contrast, are generally private and residential, and often lead to dead-ends.

The city is located along both sides of the Fez River (also known as the Oued Bou Khrareb). Although parts of the wall and some of its historic gates have disappeared, Fes el-Bali is still mostly enclosed by a long and winding circuit of defensive walls. These were entered via a number of gates, the most important of which were Bab Mahrouk (though the nearby Bab Bou Jeloud is more famous today), Bab Guissa, and Bab Ftouh. At the western end of the city were two historic kasbahs (fortified enclosures) attached to the city: the Kasbah an-Nouar, which still exists today on the northern side of Place Bou Jeloud, and the Kasbah Bou Jeloud, whose walls have since disappeared but which stood directly southwest of the current Bab Bou Jeloud gate. The Kasbah Bou Jeloud was historically the governor's residence and the seat of government control. The Almohad-built Bou Jeloud Mosque still stands there today, one of the only remnants of the original enclosure.

As in many medieval Islamic cities, the main souk streets of the city typically run from the city's main gates to the area of the city's main mosque: in this case, the Qarawiyyin and, to a lesser extent, the Zawiya of Moulay Idris II and the Mosque of the Andalusians. These mosques, in turn, are located inside or near the city's main commercial and economic zones. The souk streets themselves constitute the main commercial axes of the city and are home to most of its funduqs (inns for merchants). As a result, merchants and foreign visitors rarely had need to wander outside these areas and most of the streets branching off them lead only to local residential lanes (often called derbs), many of them leading to dead-ends. Even today, tourists are generally found only on these main commercial thoroughfares. The city's most important monuments and institutions are also located on or near its main souk streets. Accordingly, the medina has a cohesive and hierarchical urban structure that can be distinguished on two levels. At a local level, individual neighbourhoods and districts are specialized for residential, commercial, and industrial purposes. On a wider level, the city is organized in relation to major points of importance such as gates and main mosques. At this wider level, there are roughly four main centres of urban activity and organization: one around the Qarawiyin Mosque, one around the Mosque of the Andalusians, another around the Bou Inania Madrasa-Mosque, and the historically separate agglomeration of Fes el-Jdid.

Fes el-Bali is also notable for being a large car-free urban area (approximately 300 hectares), due to the well-preserved urban fabric of traditional narrow streets and alleys unsuitable for cars. Only one major road penetrates the medina from the south, following the course of the river, and reaching Place R'cif near the center of the city, which allows access for public transportation and emergency vehicles.

=== Districts and neighbourhoods ===
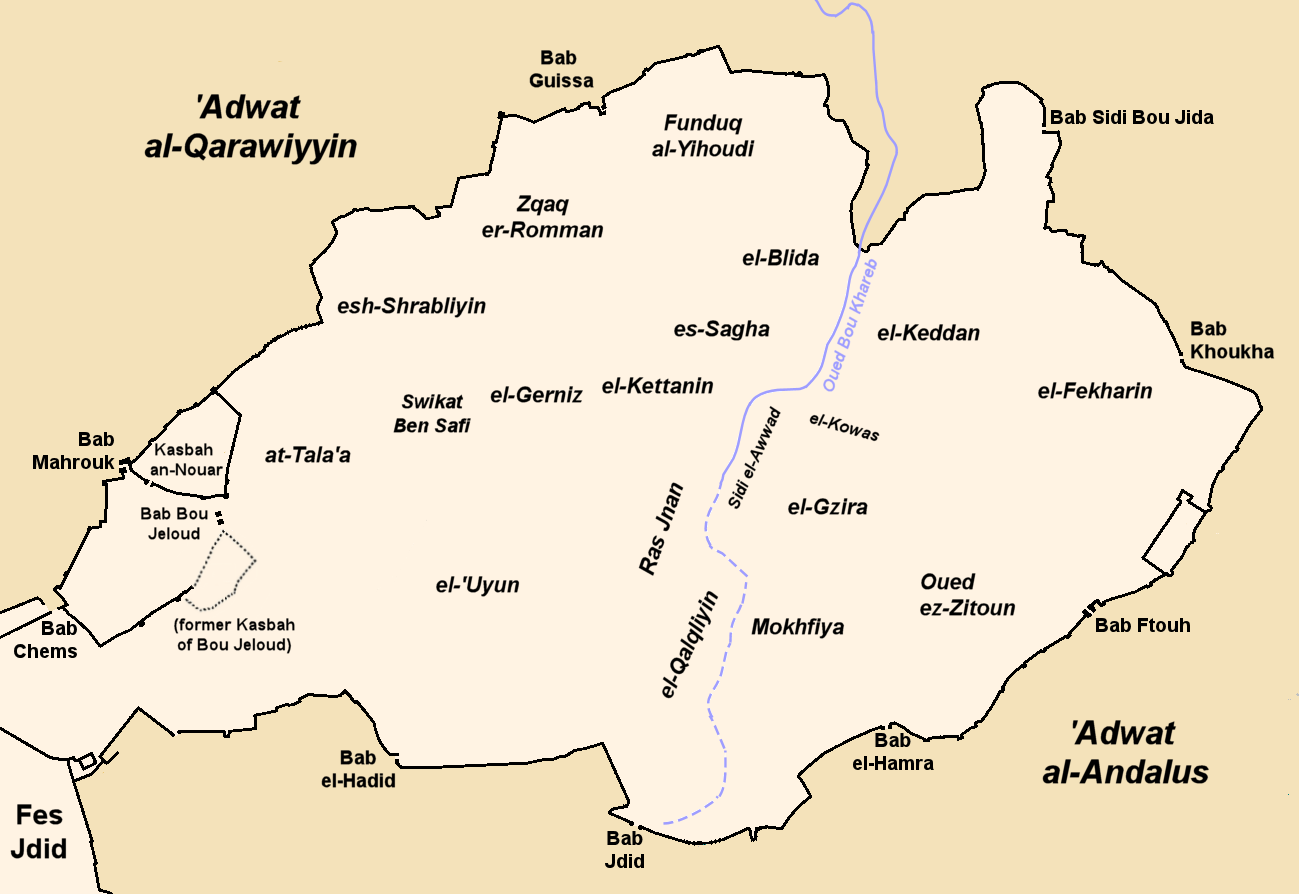
Map showing the historic walls and gates of the city, as well as the approximate locations of the historic neighbourhoods (as they existed in the early 20th century)

The city is broadly divided between two quarters, on opposite shores of the Fez River: the Qarawiyyin Quarter or 'Adwat al-Qarawiyyin (on the western shore) and the Andalusian Quarter or 'Adwat al-Andalus (on the eastern shore). These are further divided into smaller historic neighbourhoods or districts. In the early 20th century, French historian Roger Le Tourneau recorded that the city was divided administratively into the 18 neighbourhoods listed below. Le Tourneau noted that the Salwat el-Anfas, a 14th-century chronicle, lists a very similar division of neighbourhoods, even if the borders and names have changed slightly. The name 'Adwat on its own is also used in some sources to refer to the whole eastern shore of the city (the Andalusian Quarter).

Qarawiyyin Quarter:

- at-Tala'a ("the Slope/Climb")
- el-'Uyun ("the Sources")
- el-Qalqliyin
- Ras Jnan ("Beginning of the Gardens")
- el-Gerniz ("the Thistle")
- el-Kettanin ("the Textile Merchants")
- Swikat Ben Safi ("the Small Souk of Ibn Safi")
- esh-Shrabliyin ("the Slipper Merchants")
- Zqaq er-Romman ("the Street of the Pomegranate")
- Funduq el-Yihudi ("the Warehouse/Inn of the Jew")
- el-Blida ("the Small City")
- es-Sagha ("the Moneychangers")

Andalusian Quarter:

- el-Mokhfiya ("the Hidden")
- Sidi el-Awwad ("Sir Wheelwright") & el-Kowas ("the Vaults")
- el-Keddan ("the Tuff")
- el-Gzira ("the Island")
- el-Fekharin ("the Potters")
- Oued ez-Zitoun ("the River of the Olives")

Both the el-Fekharin and Oued ez-Zitoun areas, which occupy the entire eastern region of the Andalusian Quarter beyond the Andalusiyyin Mosque, were largely empty of major constructions prior to the 20th century, with the exception of a few religious structures and funduqs (merchant buildings). These districts only filled up with residential structures during the French Protectorate period in the 20th century. The al-'Uyun district, which covered a very large area in the southeastern region of the Qarawiyyin Quarter, was historically occupied by gardens and rich estates used by the city's wealthy and bourgeois classes. This is attested by the number of historic mansions still existing in this area such as the Dar Moqri and the Dar Glaoui. The name al-'Uyun, "the Sources", referred to the presence of many water streams and sources which crossed the district and provided water for its gardens.

The name Funduq el-Yihudi ("the Warehouse/Inn of the Jew") reflects the fact that, before the creation of the Mellah in Fes el-Jdid, the Jewish community had been concentrated in this neighbourhood since the time of Idris II (early 9th century). (Although Jews had also lived and worked in many other parts of the city during this period.) The city's original Jewish cemetery was also located near here, just outside the nearby gate of Bab Guissa.

== Threats and conservation ==
According to the UNESCO there are two main threats to this World Heritage Site:

- An ever-increasing population in an already dangerously overpopulated area and the uncontrolled urban development which is a result of that.
- The deterioration of the buildings

Because of the vulnerability of the site the government has adopted a special plan to care for this World Heritage Site and every building and monument it contains. The aim is to prevent houses from collapsing, increase sustainable tourism and to safeguard everything.

Since 1989 a quasi-governmental agency known as ADER-Fès (Association pour la dédensification et réhabilitation de Fès-Médina) has been charged with restoring much of the medina and safeguarding its heritage. In recent years efforts have been underway to restore more of the old medina, ranging from the restoration of dozens of individual monuments to attempts to rehabilitate the Fez River.

Place Lalla Yeddouna at the heart of the Medina has been recently undergoing reconstruction and preservation measures following a design competition sponsored by the Millennium Challenge Corporation (Washington D.C.) and the Government of the Morocco. The construction projects scheduled for completion in 2016 encompass historic preservation of particular buildings, construction of new buildings that fit into the existing urban fabric and regeneration of the riverfront. The intention is to not only preserve the quality and characteristics of the UNESCO World Heritage Site, but to encourage the development of the area as a sustainable, mixed-use area for artisanal industries and local residents.

== Landmarks ==
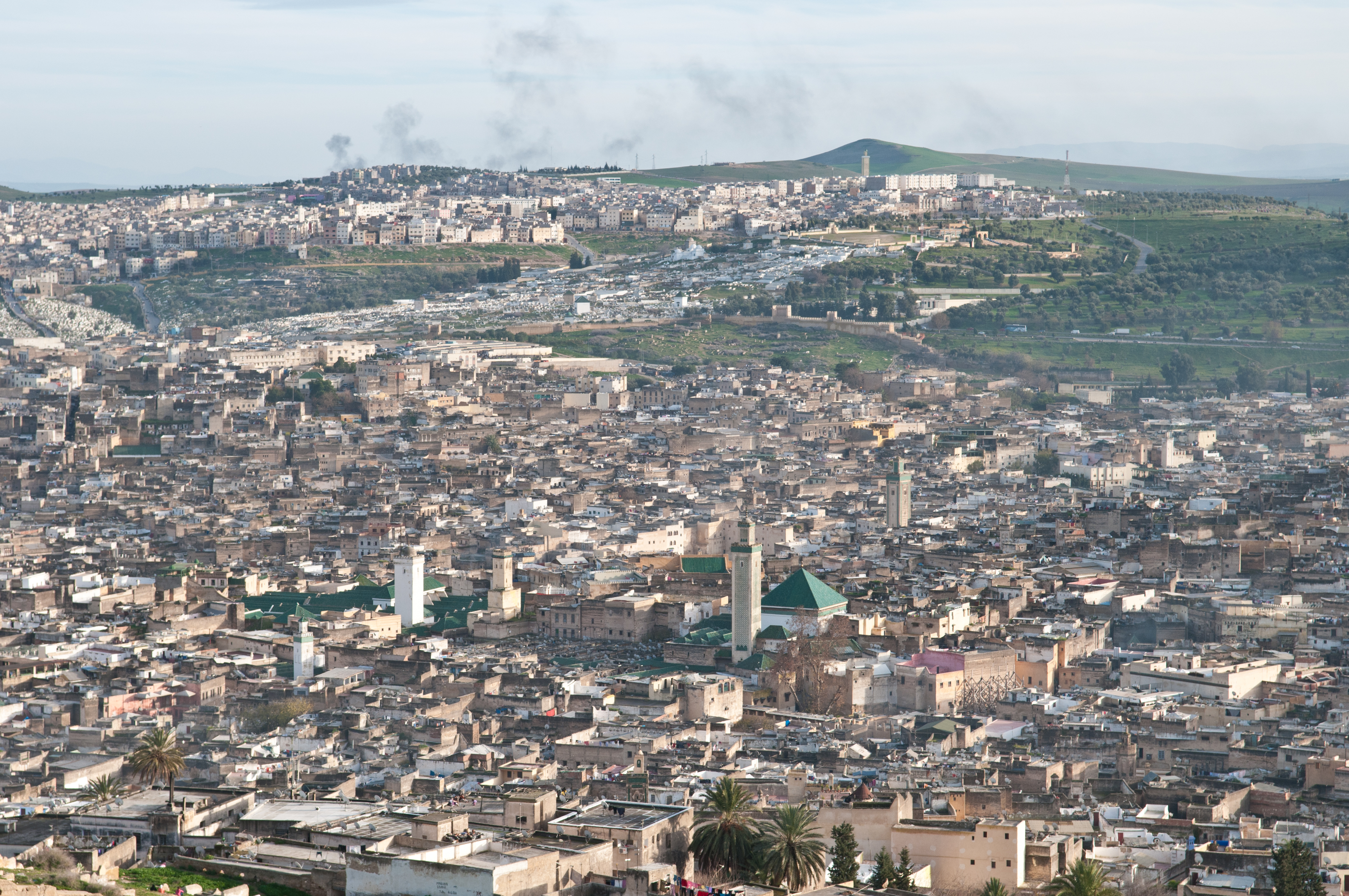
View of the medina from the Marinid Tombs to the north.

The following are some of the major historic monuments and landmarks in Fes el-Bali.

=== Mosques and zawiyas ===
- Al-Qarawiyyin Mosque-University
- Mosque of the Andalusians
- Zawiya of Moulay Idris II
- Zawiya of Sidi Ahmed al-Tijani
- Chrabliyine Mosque
- Bab Guissa Mosque
- Bou Jeloud Mosque
- R'Cif Mosque
- Abu al-Hassan Mosque
- Diwan Mosque

=== Madrasas ===
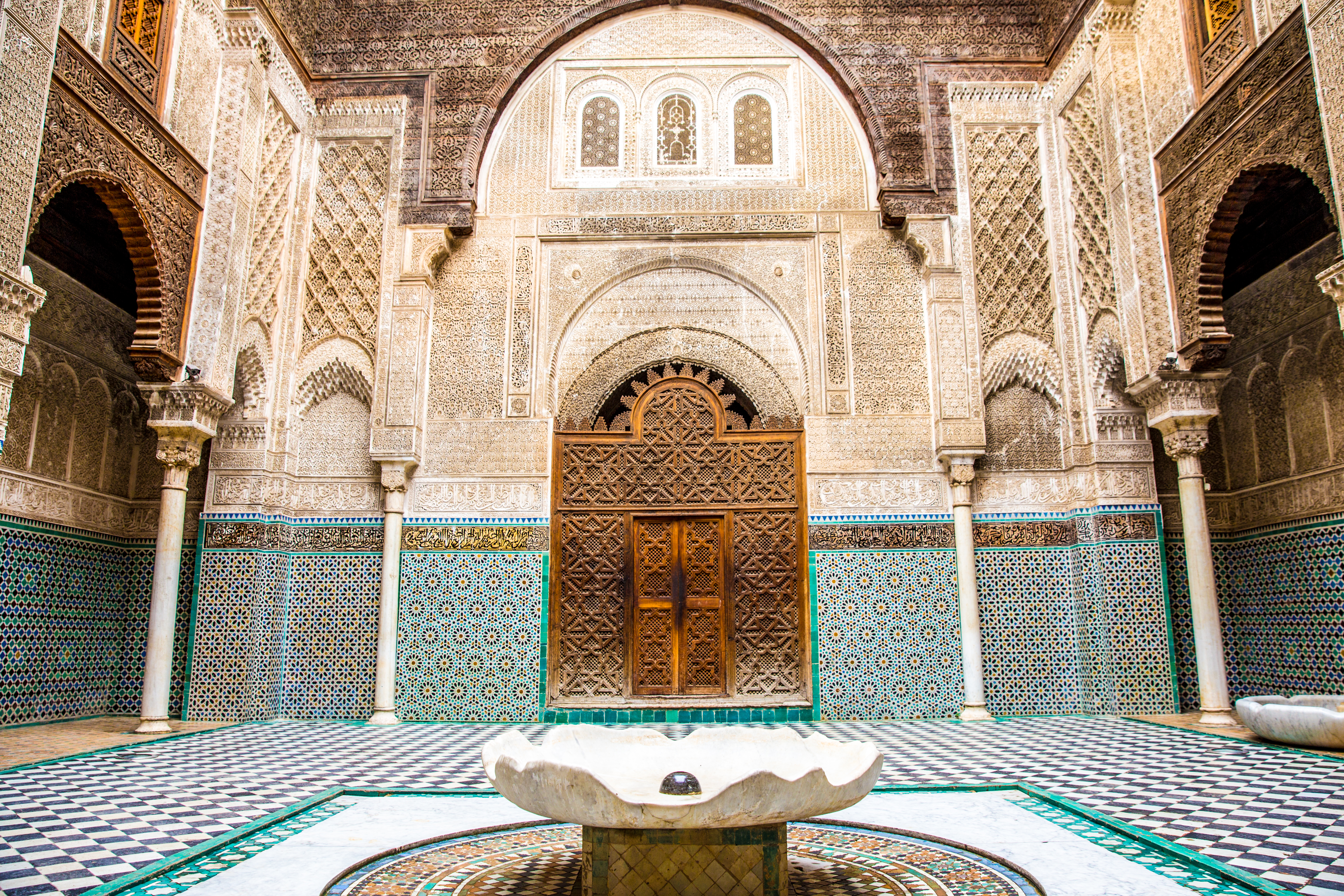
The Madrasa al-Attarine, one of the most richly-decorated historic madrasas in the city.

- Bou Inania Madrasa
- Madrasa al-Attarine
- Madrasa as-Sahrij
- Madrasa Cherratine
- Madrasa as-Seffarine
- Mesbahiyya Madrasa

=== Palaces and historic houses ===
- Dar Batha (Batha Museum)
- Dar Mnebhi
- Dar Moqri
- Dar Glaoui
- Dar Jamaï
- Dar Adiyel

=== Funduqs (traditional inns) ===
- Funduq al-Najjarin (Nejjarine Museum of Wooden Arts and Crafts)
- Funduq Staouniyyin (also known as "Foundouk Tetouaniyine")
- Funduq Shamma'in (also spelled "Foundouk Chemmaïne")
- Funduq Sagha
- Funduq Kettanin

=== Tanneries ===
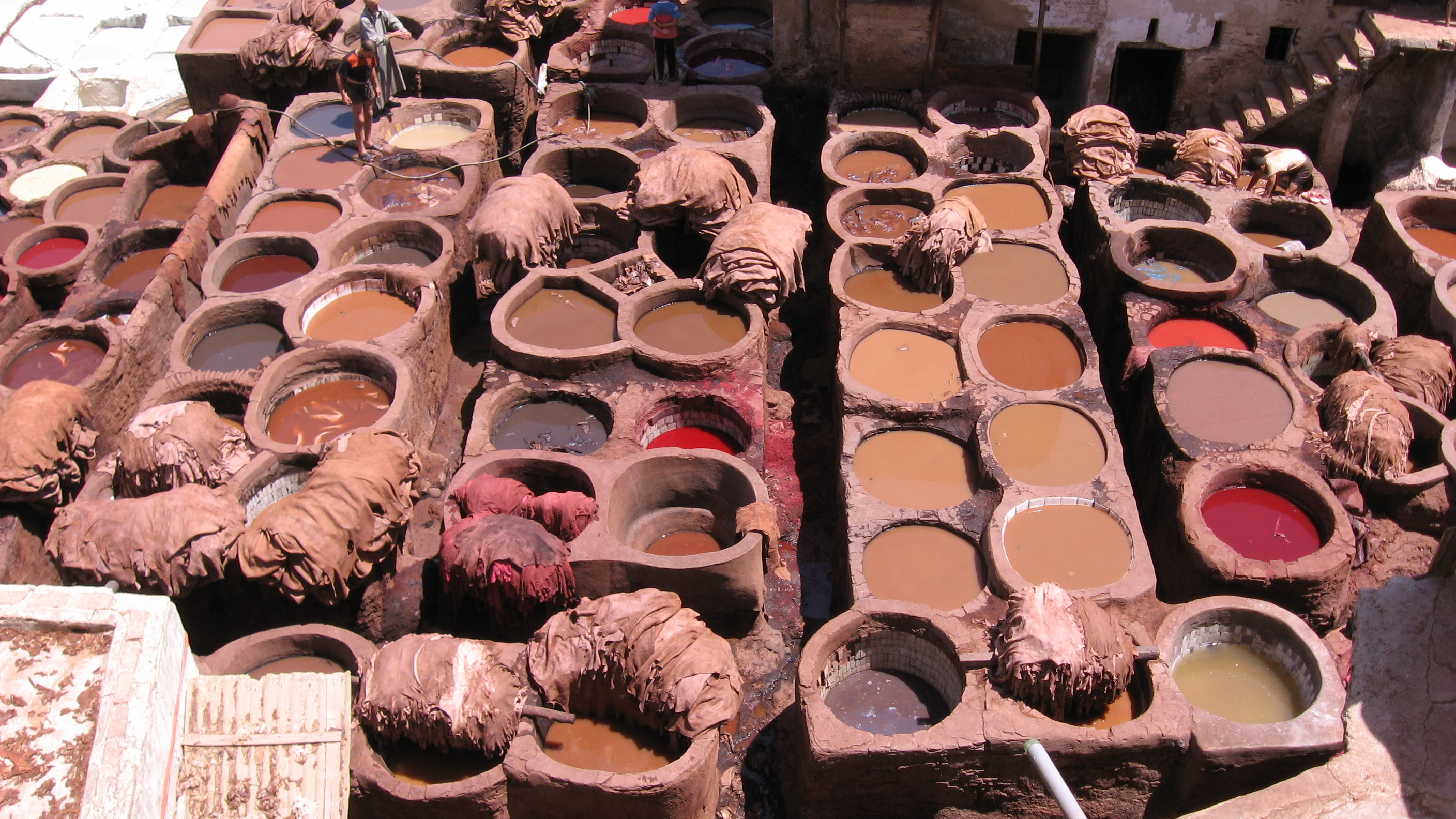
The Chouara leather tanneries in Fez.

- Chouara Tannery
- Sidi Moussa Tannery

=== Gates and fortifications ===
- Historic city walls
- Bab Bou Jeloud (gate)
- Bab Mahrouk (gate)
- Bab Ftouh (gate)
- Bab Guissa (gate)
- Borj Nord (fort; also Museum of Arms)
- Borj Sud (fort)
- Kasbah an-Nouar (walled district) and Bab Chorfa (gate)

=== Other historic landmarks ===
- Marinid Tombs
- Bab Ftouh Cemetery (including Mausoleum of Sidi Harazem)
- Tala'a Kebira (street)
- Kissariat al-Kifah (bazaar)
- Dar al-Magana
