= Funduq al-Tetwaniyyin =

Caravanserai in Fez, Morocco

Coordinates: 34°03′54.2″N 4°58′22.4″W

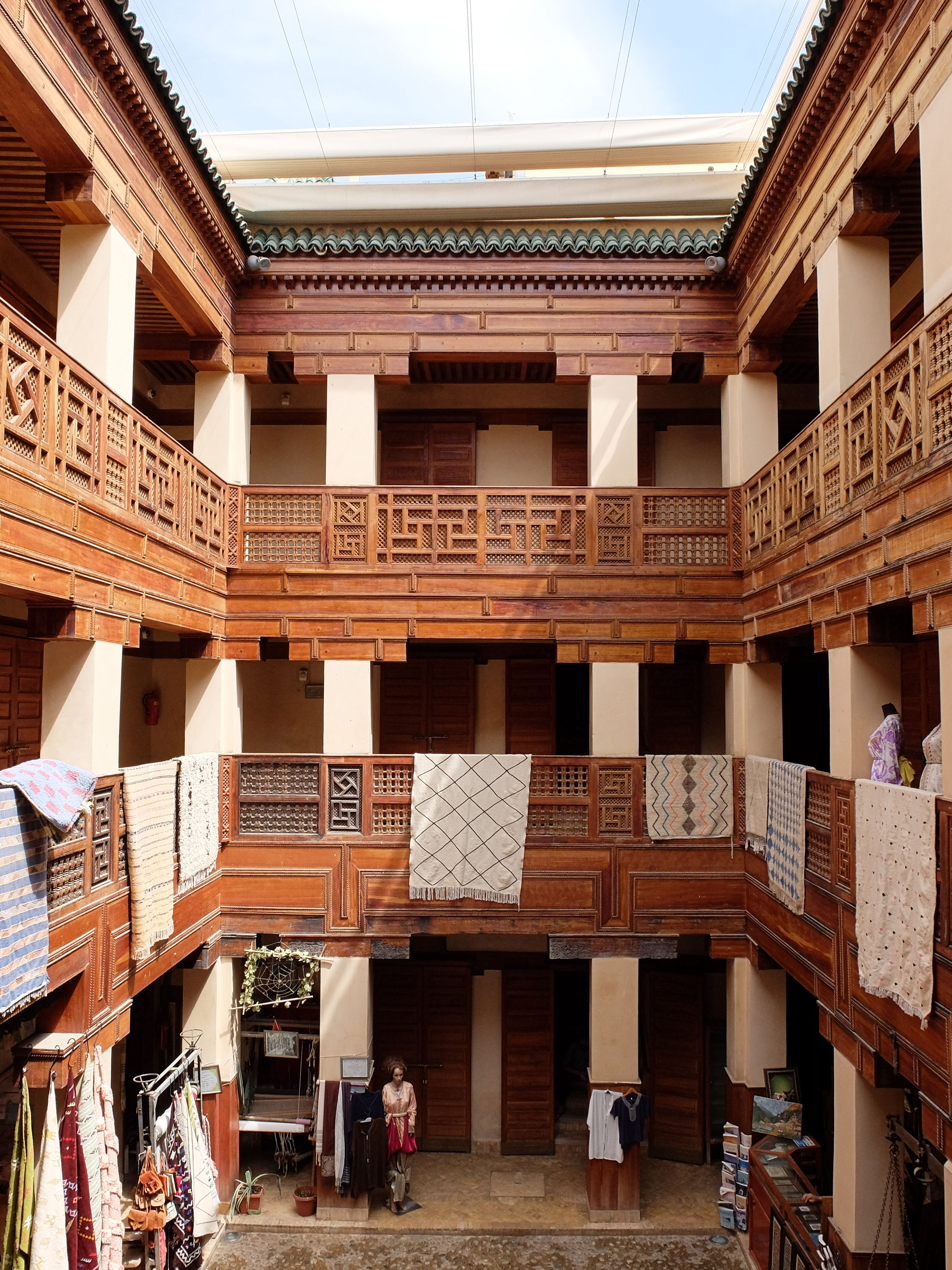
Interior of the funduq (after recent restoration)

Funduq al-Tetwaniyyin (Arabic: فندق التطوانيين, lit. 'caravanserai of the people of Tetouan'), (Note: The name is transliterated from Arabic in various ways by different authors, including: Fondok Tettawniyin, Fondouc at-Tattawiniyn, Fondouk Tattawiyin, Foundouk Tetouaniyine and Funduq al-Tattawaniyyin.) also known as Funduq al-Staouniyine, (Note: Also transliterated as Funduq al-Stawinyin.) is a historic funduq (caravanserai) in Fes el-Bali, the old city of Fes, Morocco.

== Historical background ==
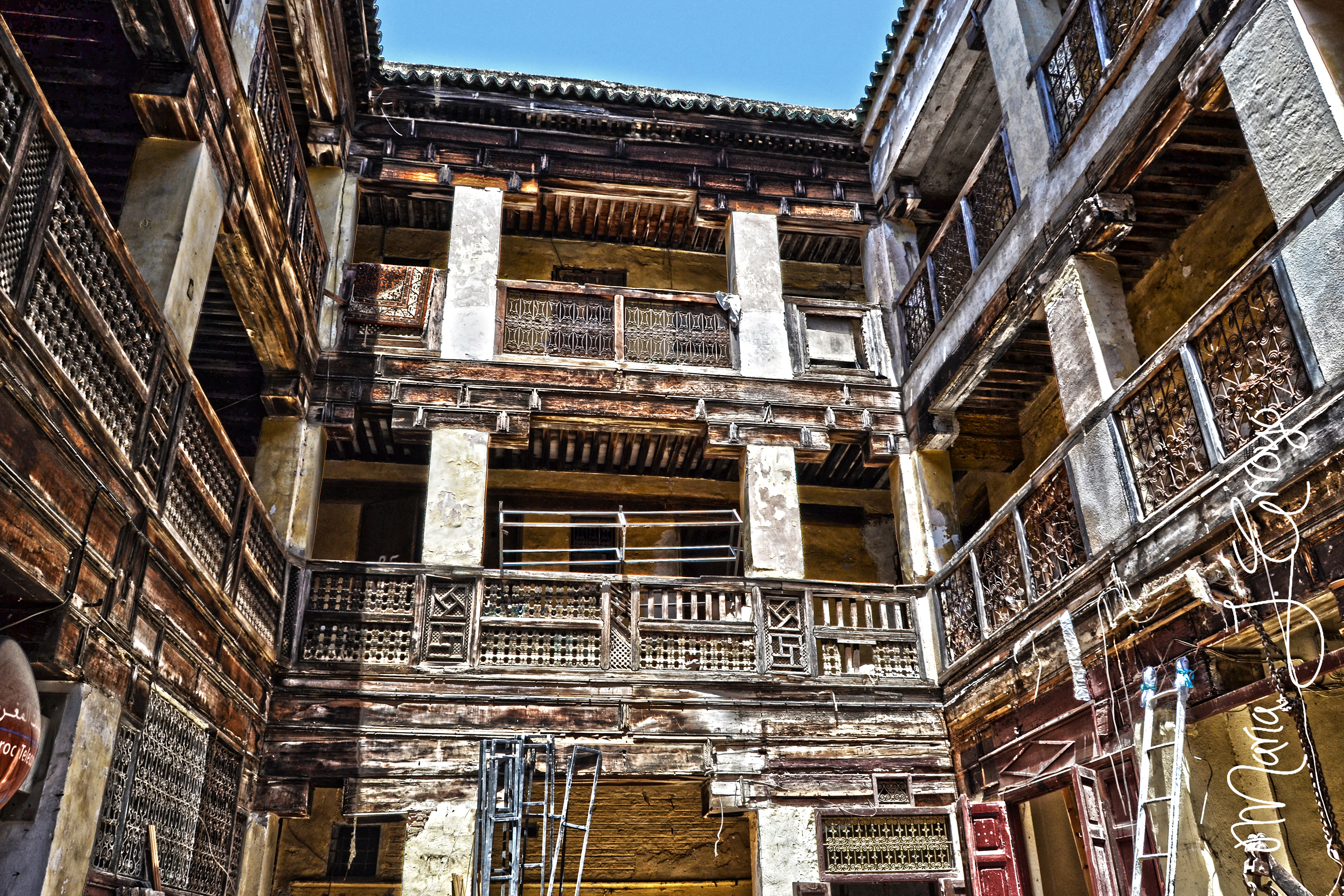
Interior of the funduq before recent restoration

The funduq is located next to the al-Qarawiyyin Mosque, facing its northeastern corner and close to the Mesbahiyya Madrasa. It was founded in the 14th century during the Marinid era, probably around the same time as the construction of the al-Attarine Madrasa by Sultan Abu Sa'id Uthman II, making it one of the oldest funduqs in Fes. It was probably called Funduq er-Ridā' in the medieval period.

Funduqs were a type of urban caravanserai in Morocco which served as an inn and commercial center for trade, providing services and accommodations for merchants and travelers from outside the city. Some funduqs were also occupied by artisans and manufacturers instead of merchants, but the Staouniyyin Funduq was solely for merchants. The name Tetwaniyyin means "people from Tetouan" (a city in northern Morocco), suggesting that merchants in Fes were historically grouped together by origin.

The building was classified as a national monument in 1925. It was more recently restored, along with a number of other funduqs, by the ADER-Fes heritage preservation agency, and reopened in March 2019 as a cultural and commercial center for artisans, with some modern amenities added.

== Architecture ==
The funduq has a typical layout that matches other caravanserais in Morocco and in Nasrid Granada at the time, consisting of a courtyard surrounded by a multi-storied gallery that gives access to rooms arranged across its three floors. It has a usable floor area (after recent restorations) of 437 square metres. The galleries are supported by wooden lintels resting on square pillars, and are lined with wooden mashrabiya-like railings or parapets. The ground floor was most likely used for storage of animals and merchandise, and was the site of trading and commerce, while the upper floors were for sleeping accommodations.

The building is also noted for its vestibule, which has a ceiling of carved and painted wood featuring geometric and floral motifs, as well as an Arabic inscription carved in Kufic script. The woodcarving of the corbels on the courtyard side of the vestibule is especially sophisticated and is among the finest surviving examples from the Marinid period.

Carved woodwork in the vestibule

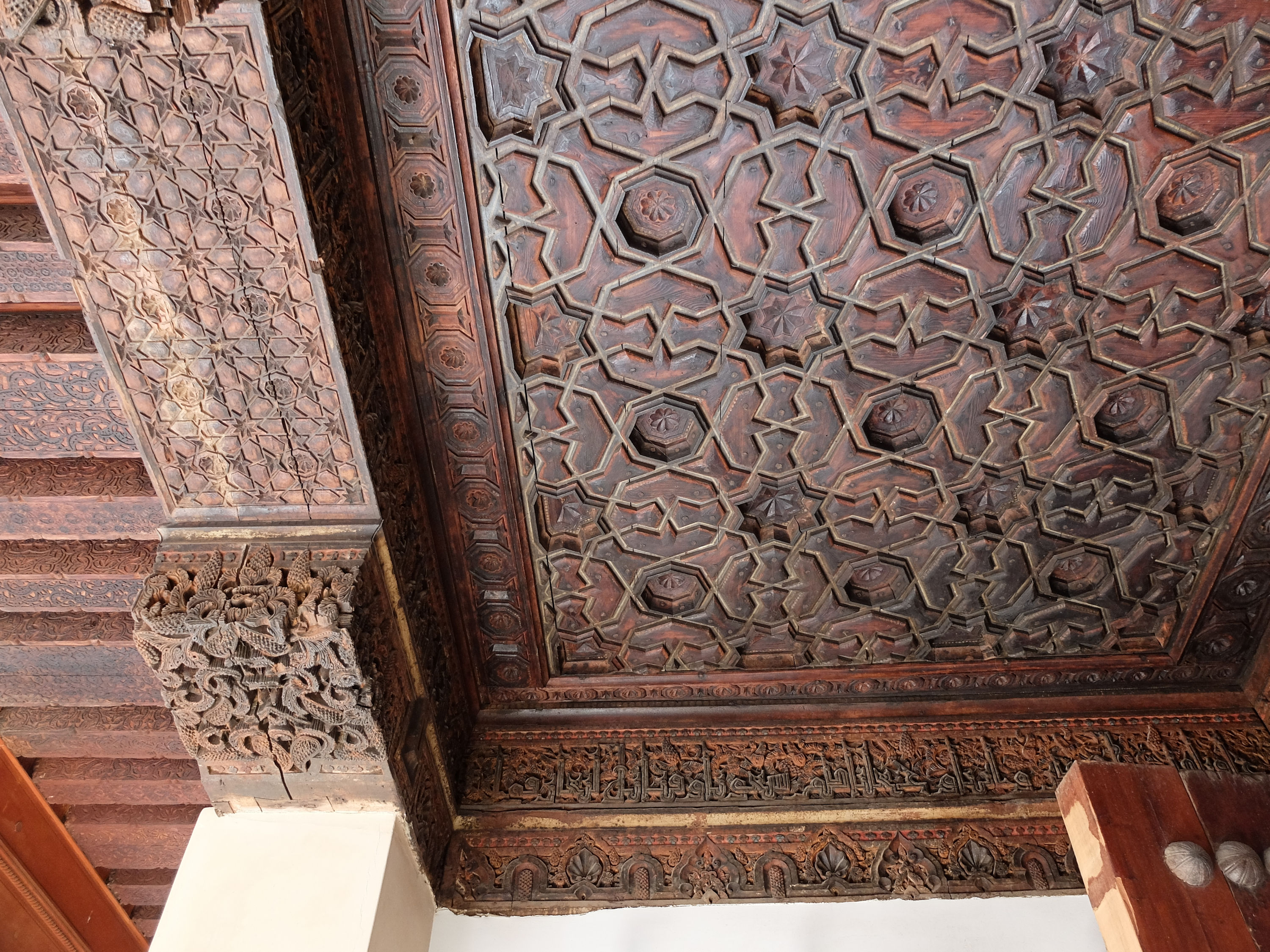
Wooden ceiling of the vestibule, with elements of original Marinid-era woodwork

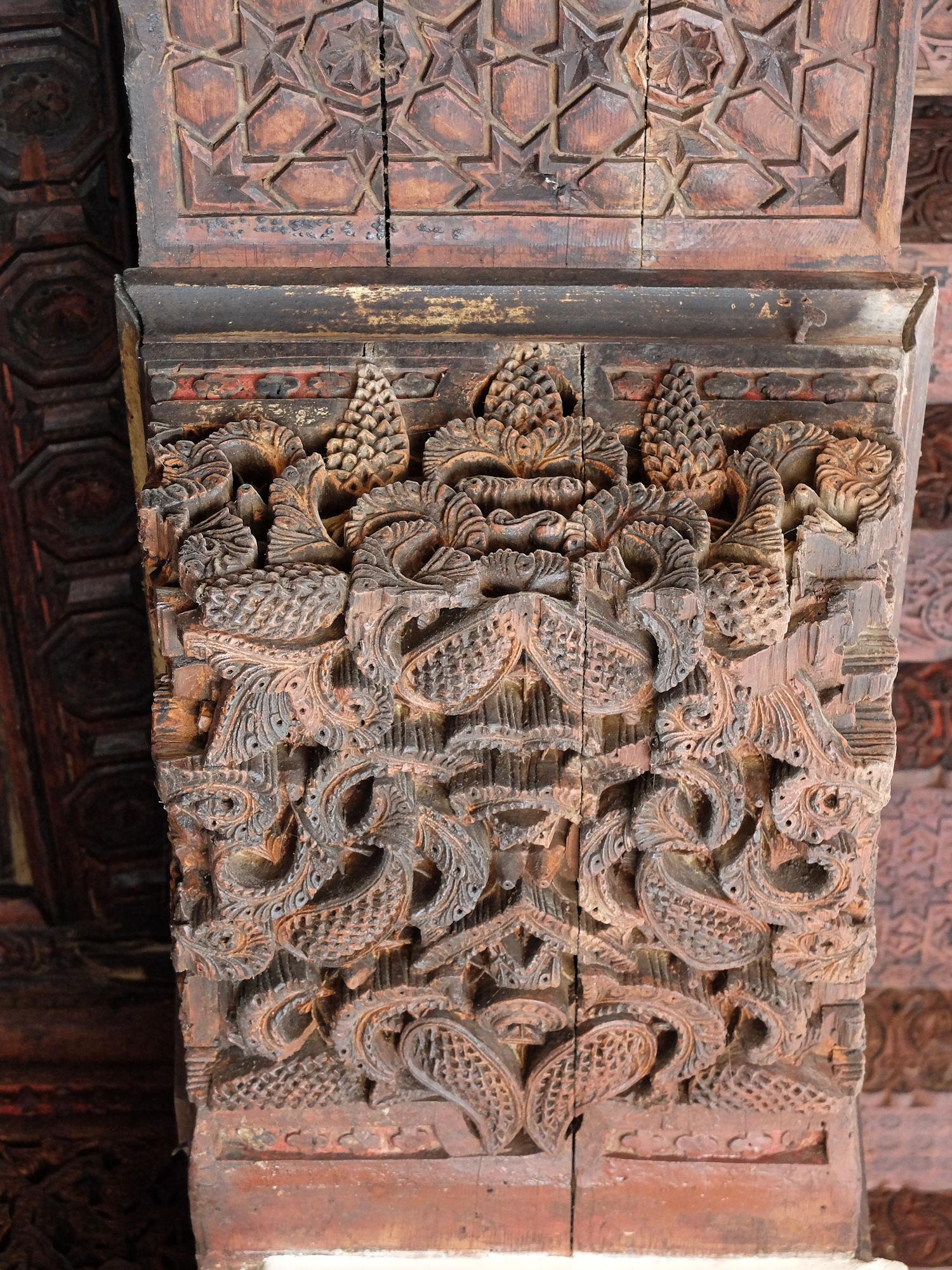
Detail of the wooden corbels in the vestibule

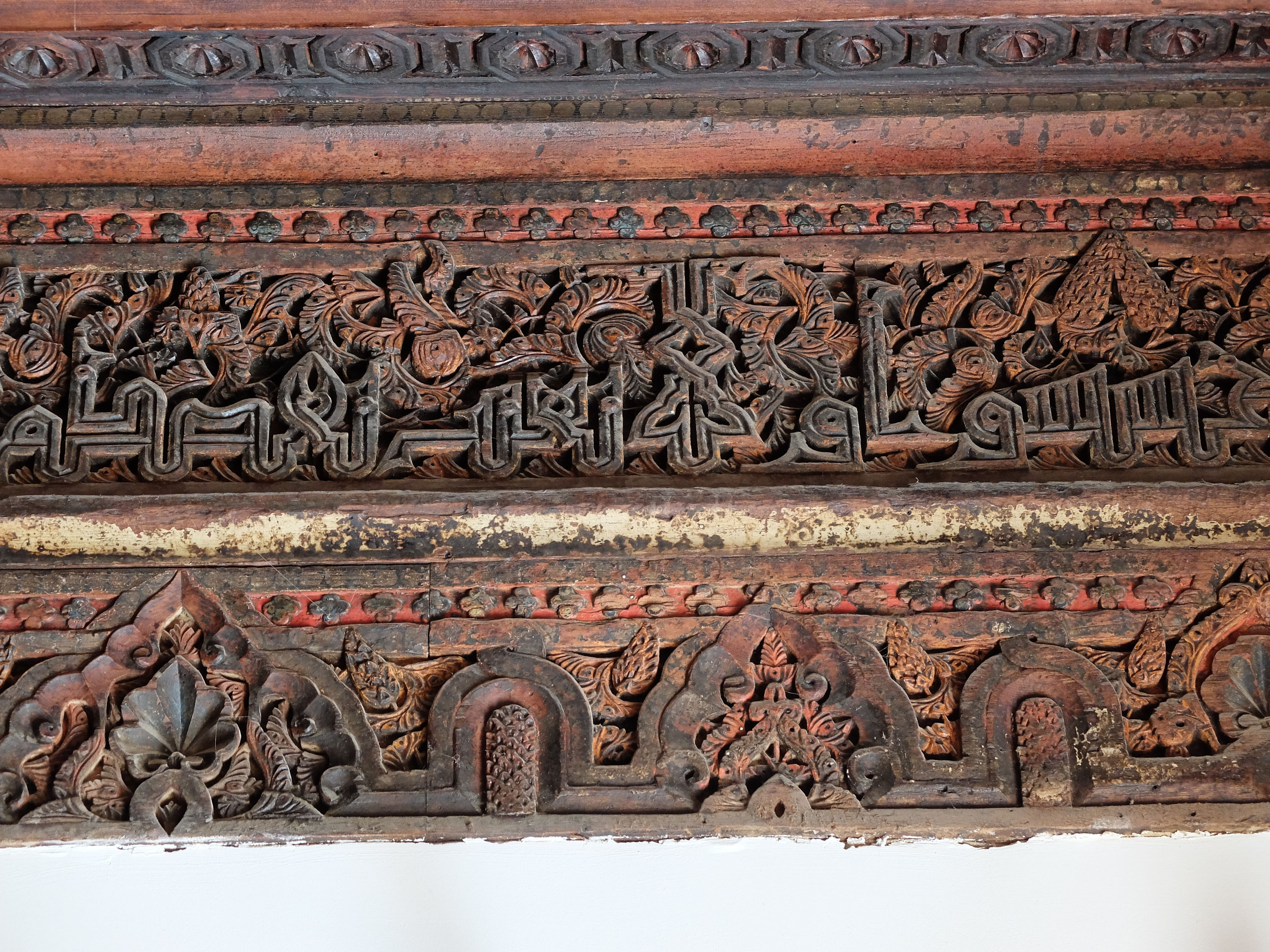
Carved Kufic inscription and vegetal motifs

== See also ==
- Funduq al-Najjarin
