= Funduq Kettanin =

Caravanserai in Fez, Morocco

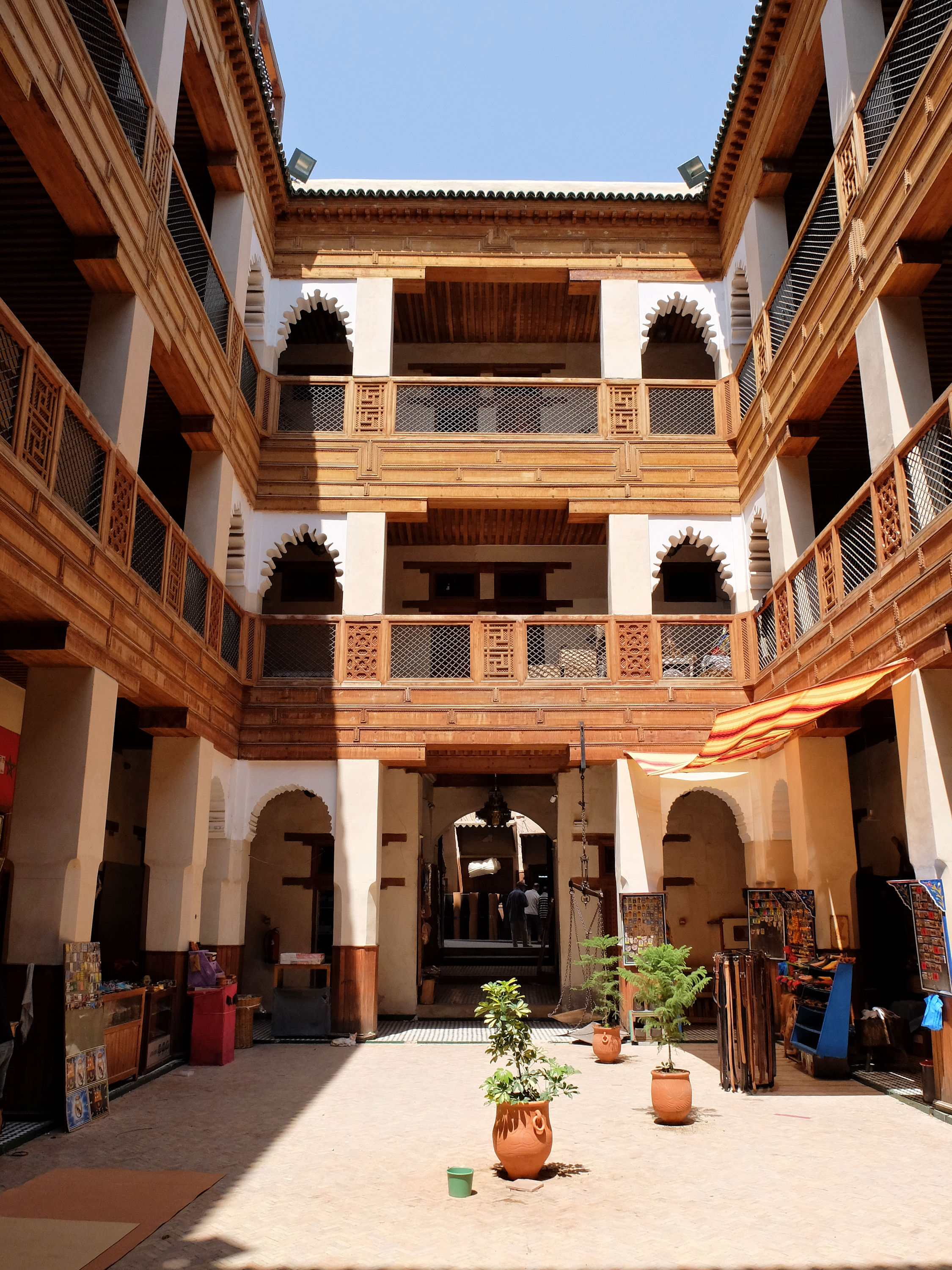
Interior of the Funduq Kettanin (after recent restoration)

The Funduq Kettanin (also spelled Foundouk Kettanine), also known as Funduq Jdid, is a historic funduq (caravanserai or inn) located in Fes el-Bali, the old medina of Fes, Morocco. It was built in the late 19th century by Haj Houssein Bennani, the official responsible for habous affairs during the reign of Moulay Hassan (ruled 1873–1894). It was used primarily as lodging for merchants visiting the city. The funduq was recently restored during a major rehabilitation program involving over two dozen other historic monuments in the city.
