= Borj Nord =

Building in Morocco

- برج الشمال (Arabic); البرج الشمالي (Arabic)
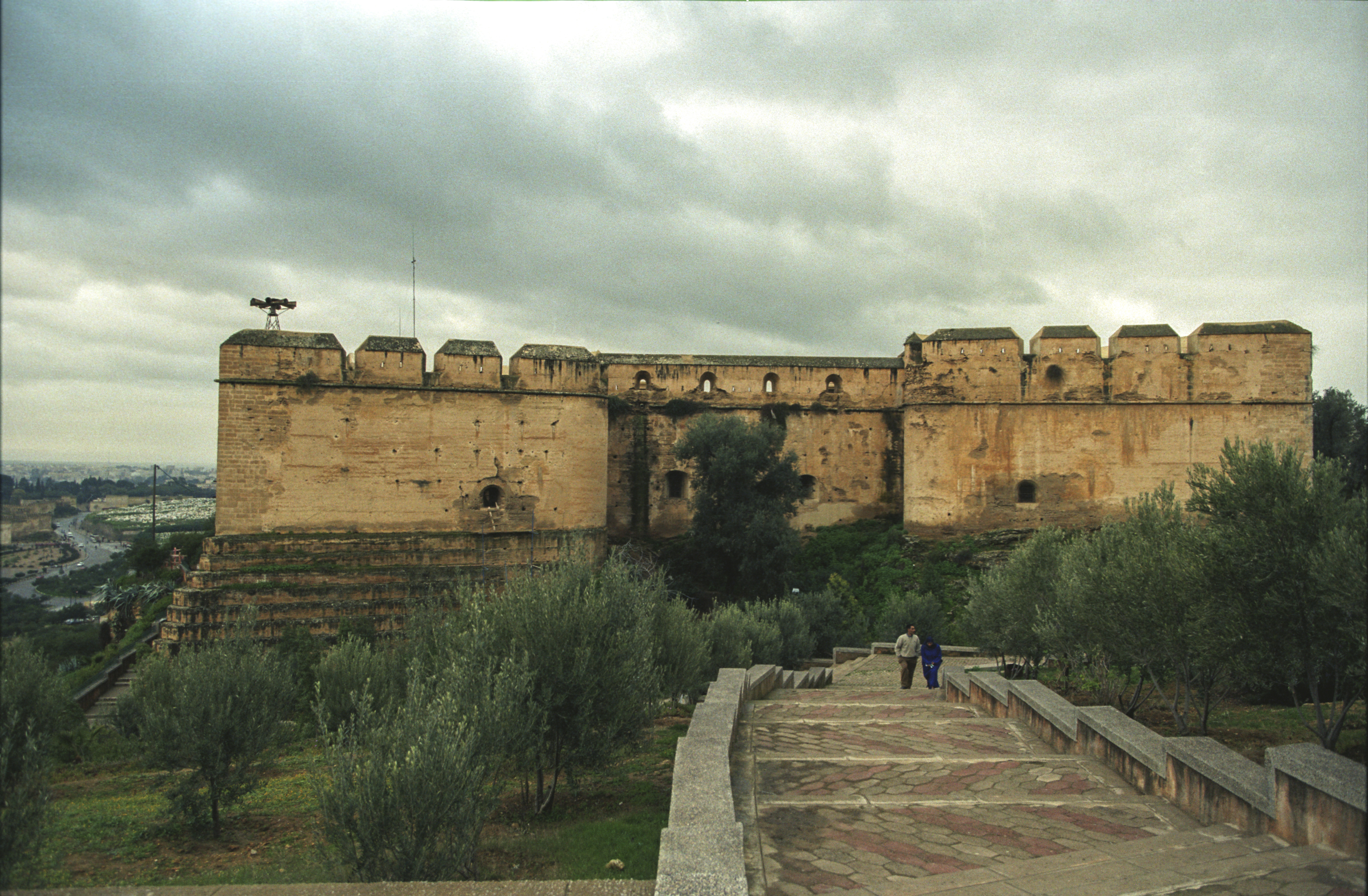
- Interactive map of Borj Nord
- 34°04′1.7″N 4°59′5.6″W
- Type: Kasbah/Fortress
- Location: Fez, Morocco

History
- Founder: Sultan Ahmad al-Mansur
- Built: 1582
- Original use: Military fort

Site notes
- Architectural styles: Saadian, Moroccan
- Current use: Museum

Borj Nord or Burj al-Shamal (Arabic: برج الشمال), Al-Burj ash-Shamali (Arabic: البرج الشمالي) is a fort in the city of Fez, Morocco. It was first established in 1582 by the Saadi dynasty, modeled after the Portuguese forts in the 16th century. It is among the largest defense structures around the city of Fez and one of the few to incorporate European-style changes in military architecture in the gunpowder age. Today, the fort is open to the public as the Museum of Arms.

== History ==
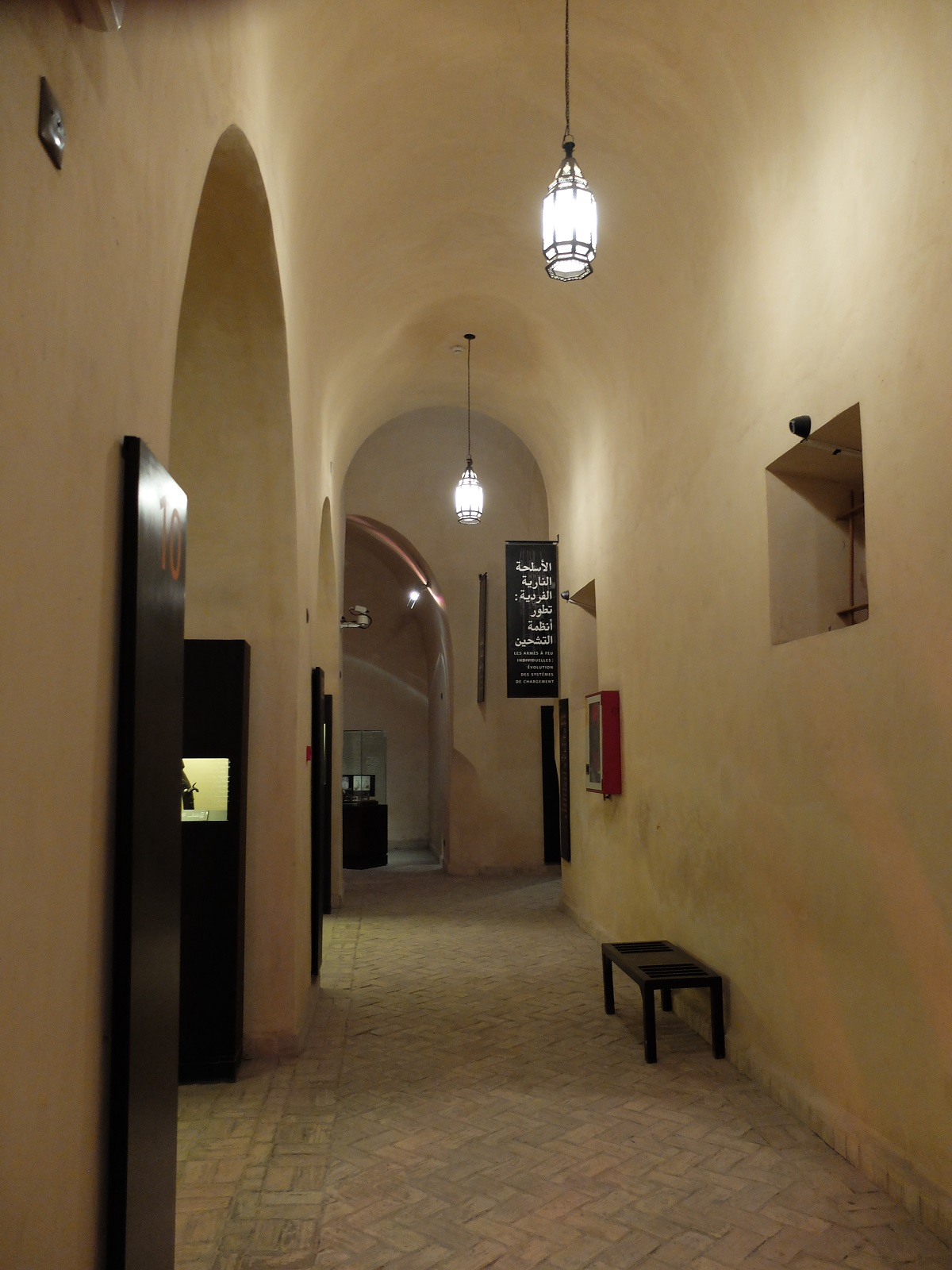
Inside the fort and the museum.

The fort was built in 1582 by the powerful Saadi sultan Ahmad al-Mansour. The Saadians, whose capital was Marrakesh, had faced notable resistance to their rule in Fez and the fort is one of several that they built around the city. They were intended as much to keep the restless population of Fes el-Bali (the old city) under control as to actually defend the city from external attacks. Accordingly, the forts were built in commanding positions overlooking the city, from which their canons could easily bombard the city if desired. Along with Borj Nord, the other forts built at this time were: Borj Sud, facing Borj Nord across the valley on a hilltop overlooking Fez from the south; Kasbah Tamdert, a citadel guarding Bab Ftouh to the south-east; and the Borj Sheikh Ahmed, one of three bastions built along the east and south walls of Fes el-Jdid and the one closest to Fes el-Bali. The Saadians built Borj Nord, Borj Sud, and the new bastions of Fes el-Jdid to emulate Portuguese military architecture; a consequence of their wars to oust the Portuguese from Morocco. Their construction was probably helped by the labour and expertise of European prisoners captured in the famous Battle of the Three Kings in 1578. These were the first, and arguably only, fortresses in Fez designed for the new age of gunpowder.

== Architecture ==
Architecturally, Borj Nord reflects the adaptation of Fez's fortifications to artillery warfare in the early modern period. The large corner bastions of the fort (giving it a star-like appearance from above) are believed to have been added later during the Alaouite period. The original fort would have been more compact and almost cubic in appearance, similar to Borj Sud, which still retains its original form.

== Museum of Arms ==
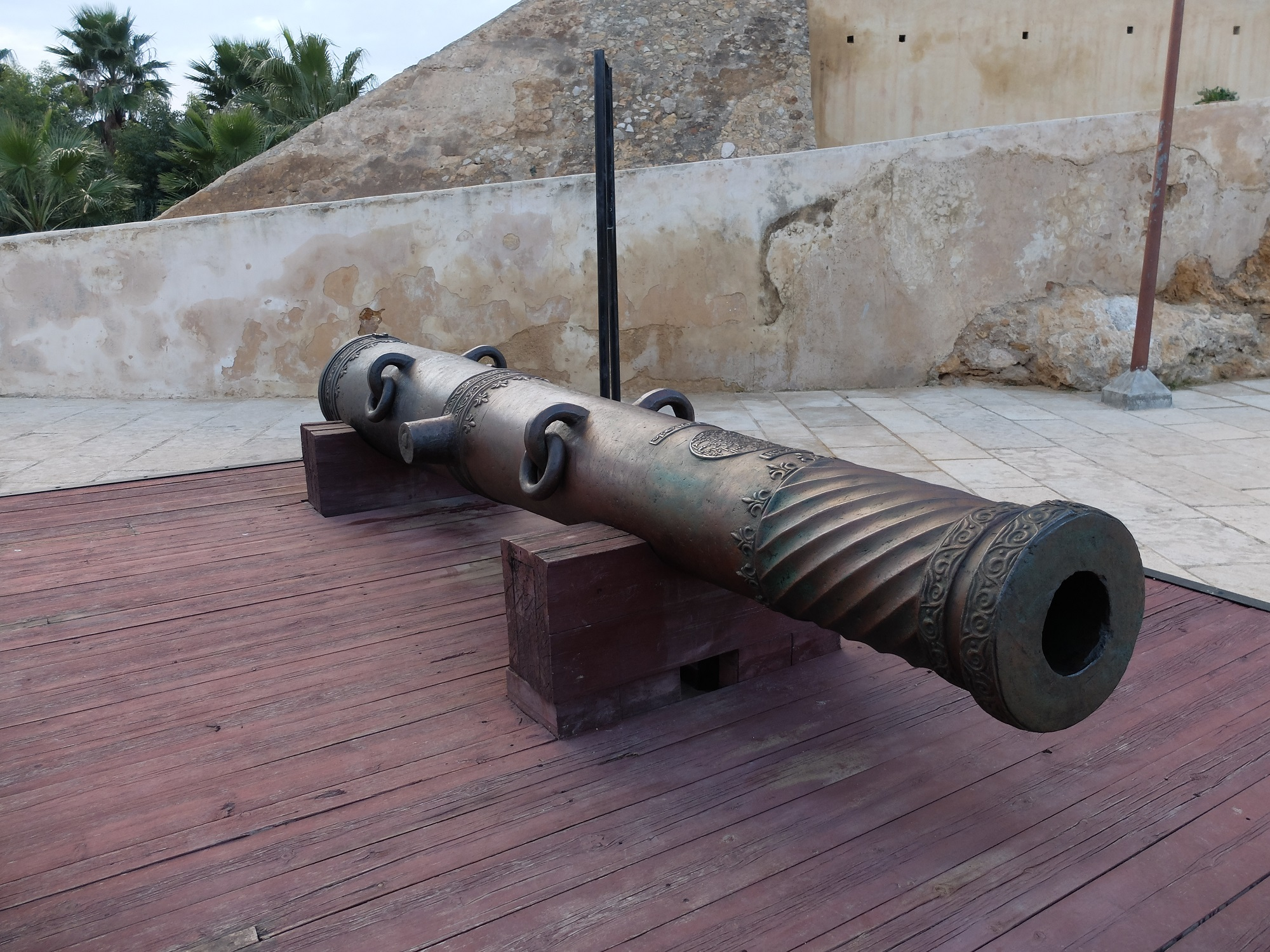
Memona Gun A Saadian cannon from the Battle of the Three Kings.

Today the fort houses the Museum of Arms (French: Musée des armes). Founded in 1963, it was the first museum in Morocco specializing in the history of arms and armour. Its collection includes up to 5,000 pieces (only a part of which are on display) originating from 35 countries and dating from prehistory to the 20th century. The museum emphasizes the collection of Moroccan arms, and features a large number that were manufactured in Fez in the Makina, an industrial arms factory established in 1886 next to the Royal Palace in Fez. One of the notable artifacts on display is an enormous Saadian cannon that was used during the Battle of Three Kings in 1578, nearly 5 meters long and weighing around 12 tons.

The building, museum, and its collection were extensively restored in 2003.

== Gallery ==
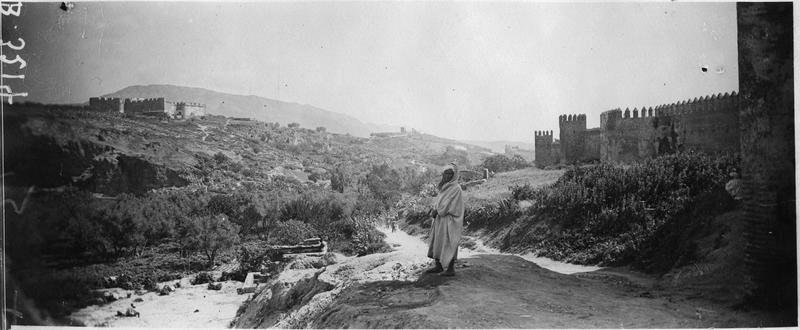
Fortification of the kasba Filala ramparts in Fez

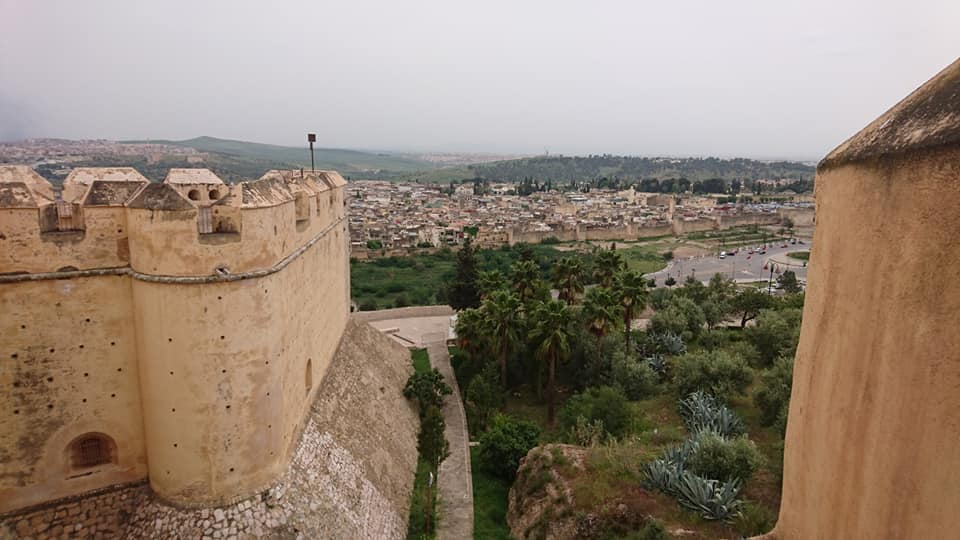
View of Fez from Borj Nord

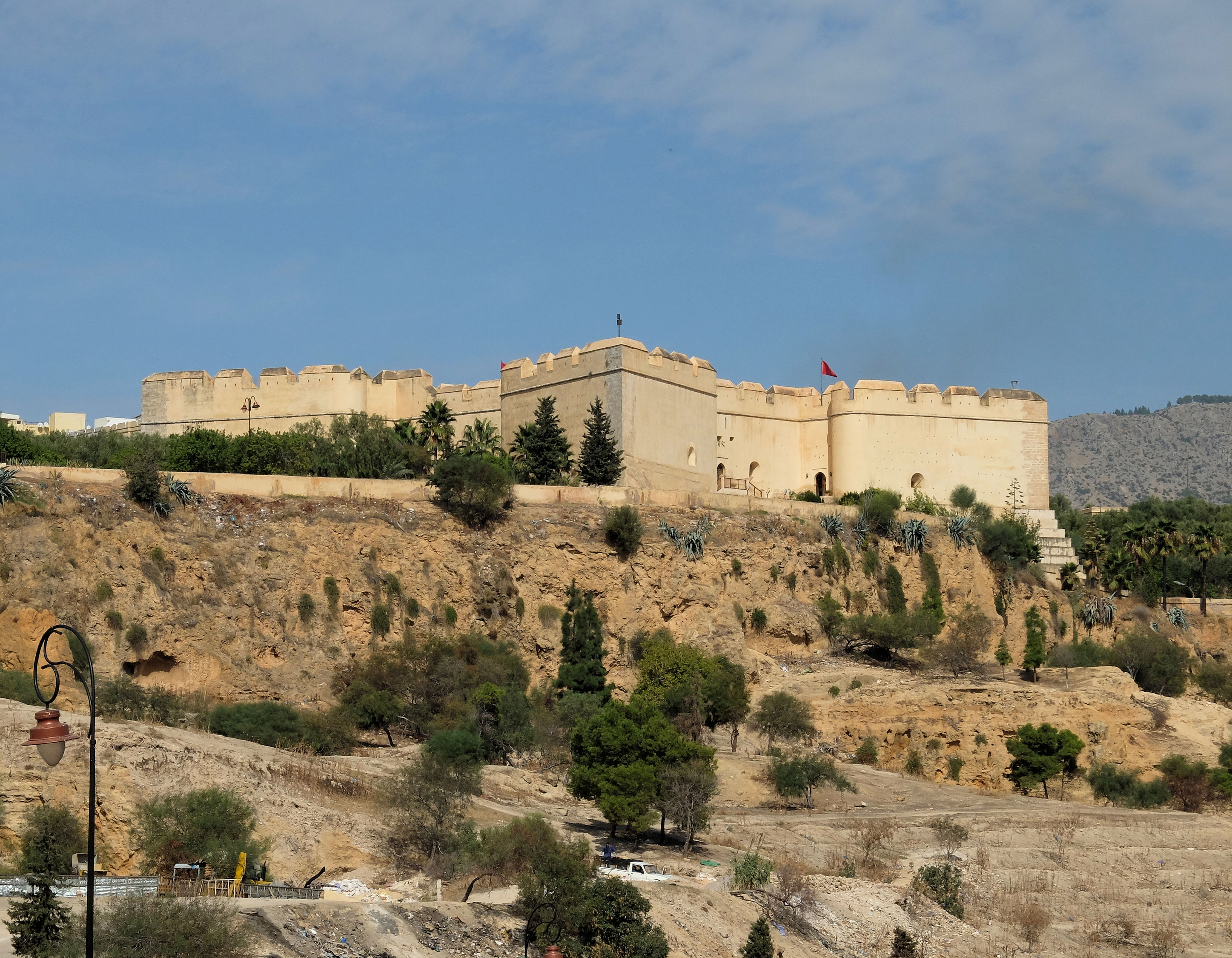
Borj Nord

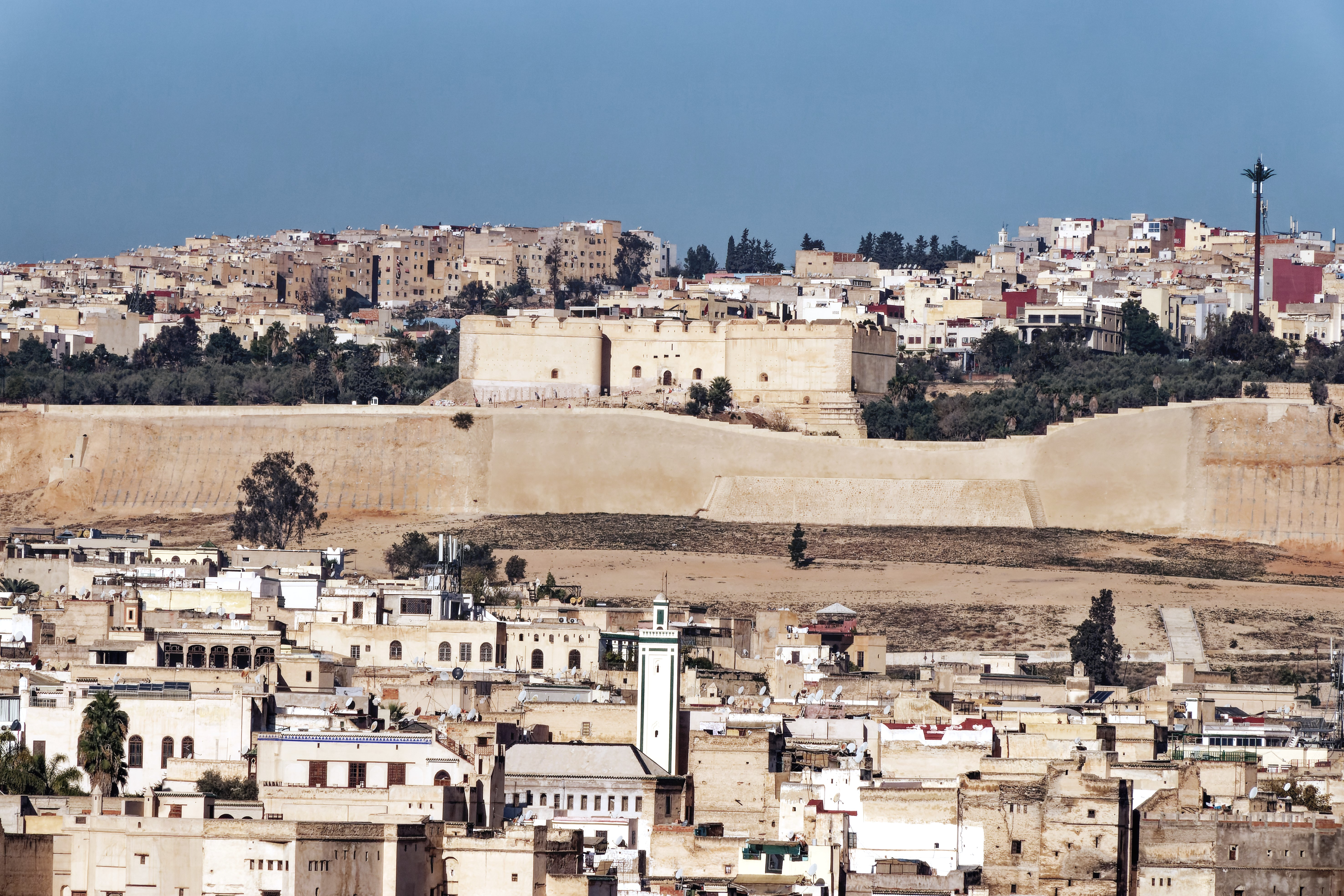
View of old Fez
