= Mausoleum of Sidi Harazem =

Mausoleum in Fez, Morocco

Coordinates: 34°03′35″N 4°57′42.1″W

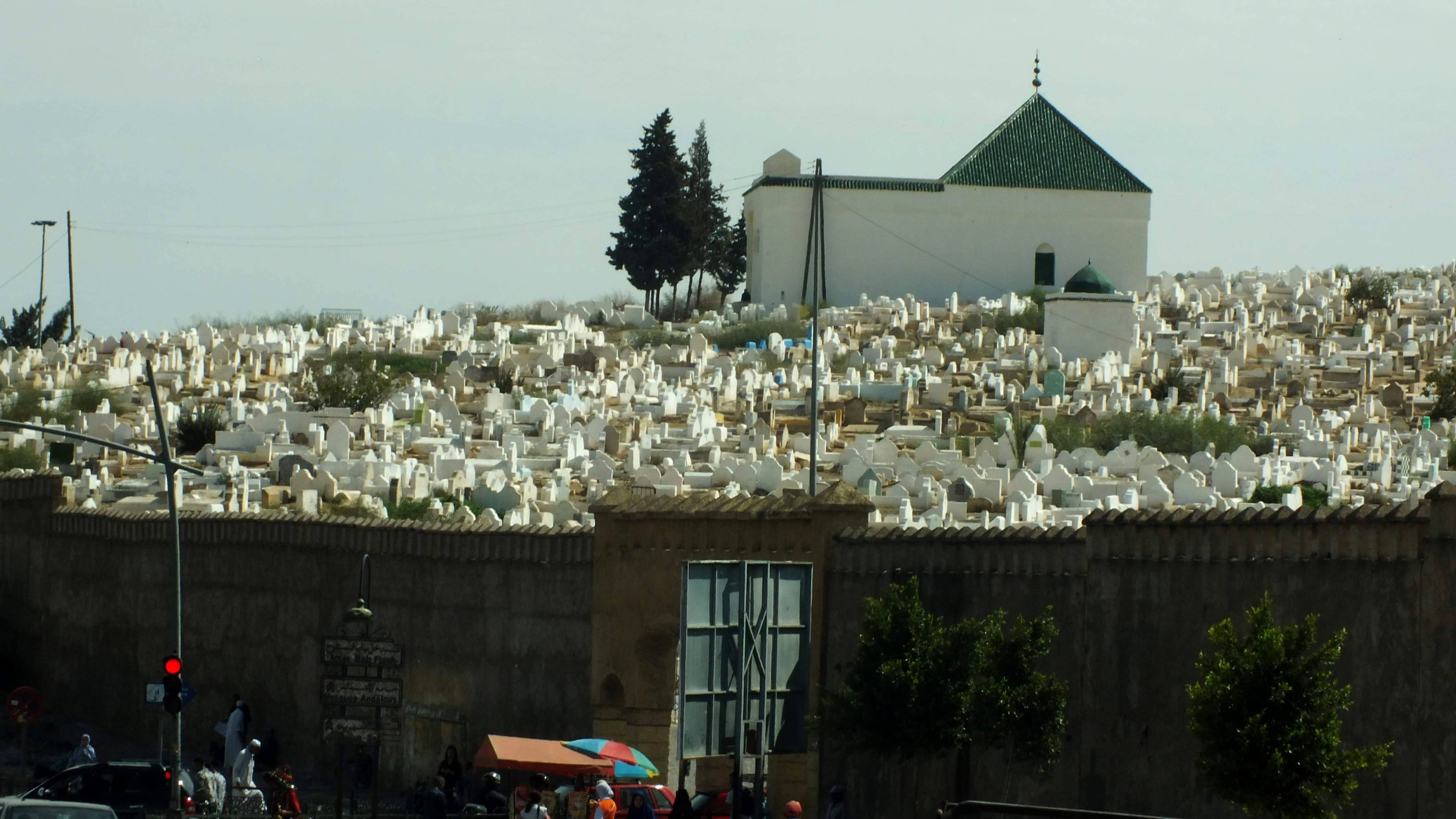
View of the mausoleum in the Bab Ftouh Cemetery

The Mausoleum of Sidi Harazem or Marabout of Sidi Harazem is a funerary monument and shrine in Fez, Morocco. It is located in the Bab Ftouh Cemetery, one of the city's largest historic cemeteries. It contains the tomb of Sidi 'Ali ibn Harazem (also spelled Harazim or Harzihim), a 12th-century Sufi mystic who died in 1164–65.

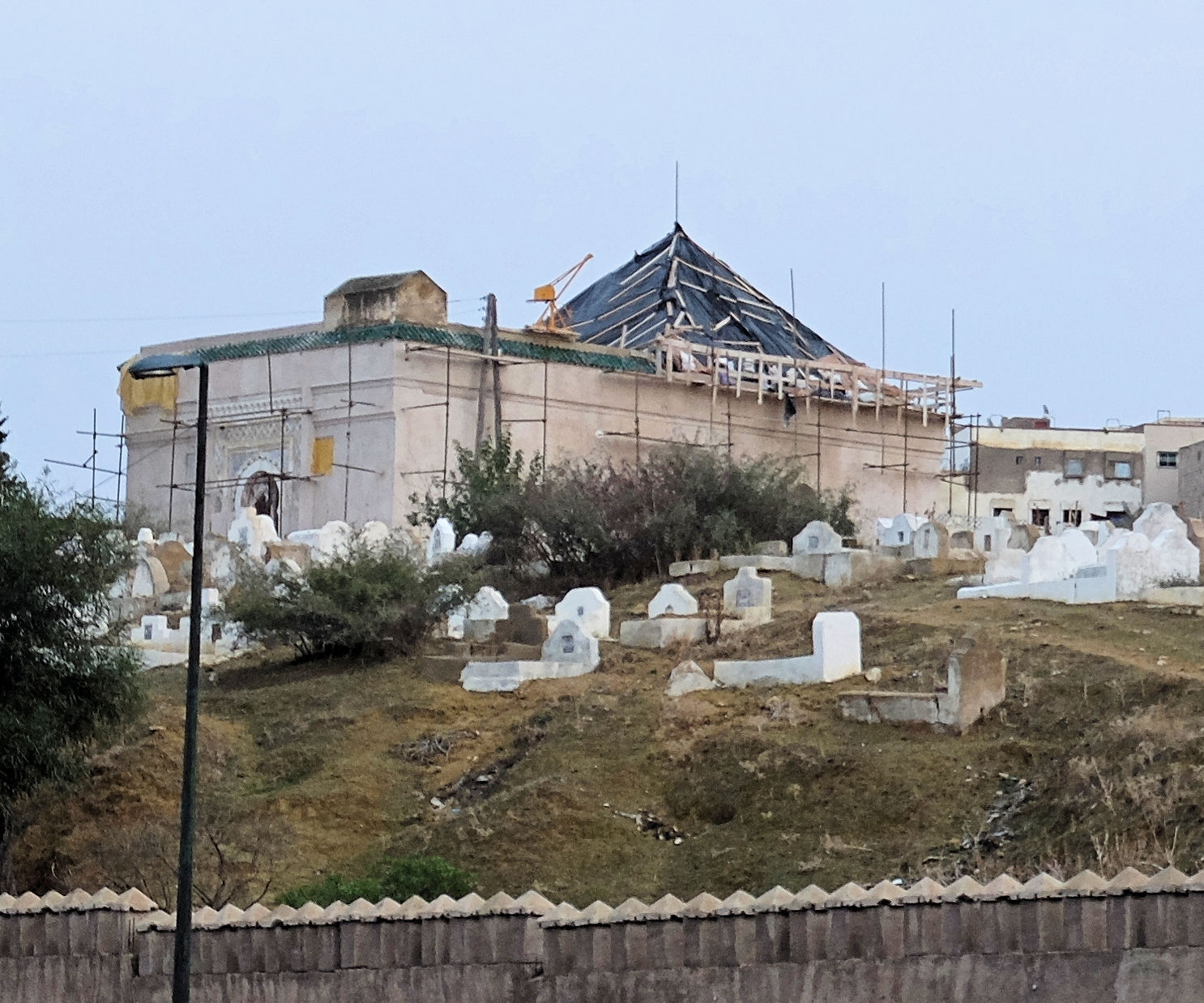
The mausoleum during restoration works in 2014

His mausoleum, marked by a green pyramidal roof, is the most prominent structure of the cemetery, one section of which is named after him. The founder of the Alaouite dynasty, Moulay Rashid, was buried here in the 17th century. The current structure was built (or rebuilt) by Sultan Mohammed ibn Abdallah in the late 18th century. The tomb of Sidi Harazem is still the subject of a popular moussem (religious festival) every spring and his tomb was historically involved in other popular religious rituals and events. The mausoleum was recently restored in the mid-2010s by the local conservation agency ADER-Fès.

== See also ==
- Marabout
