= Borj Sud =

- برج الجنوب
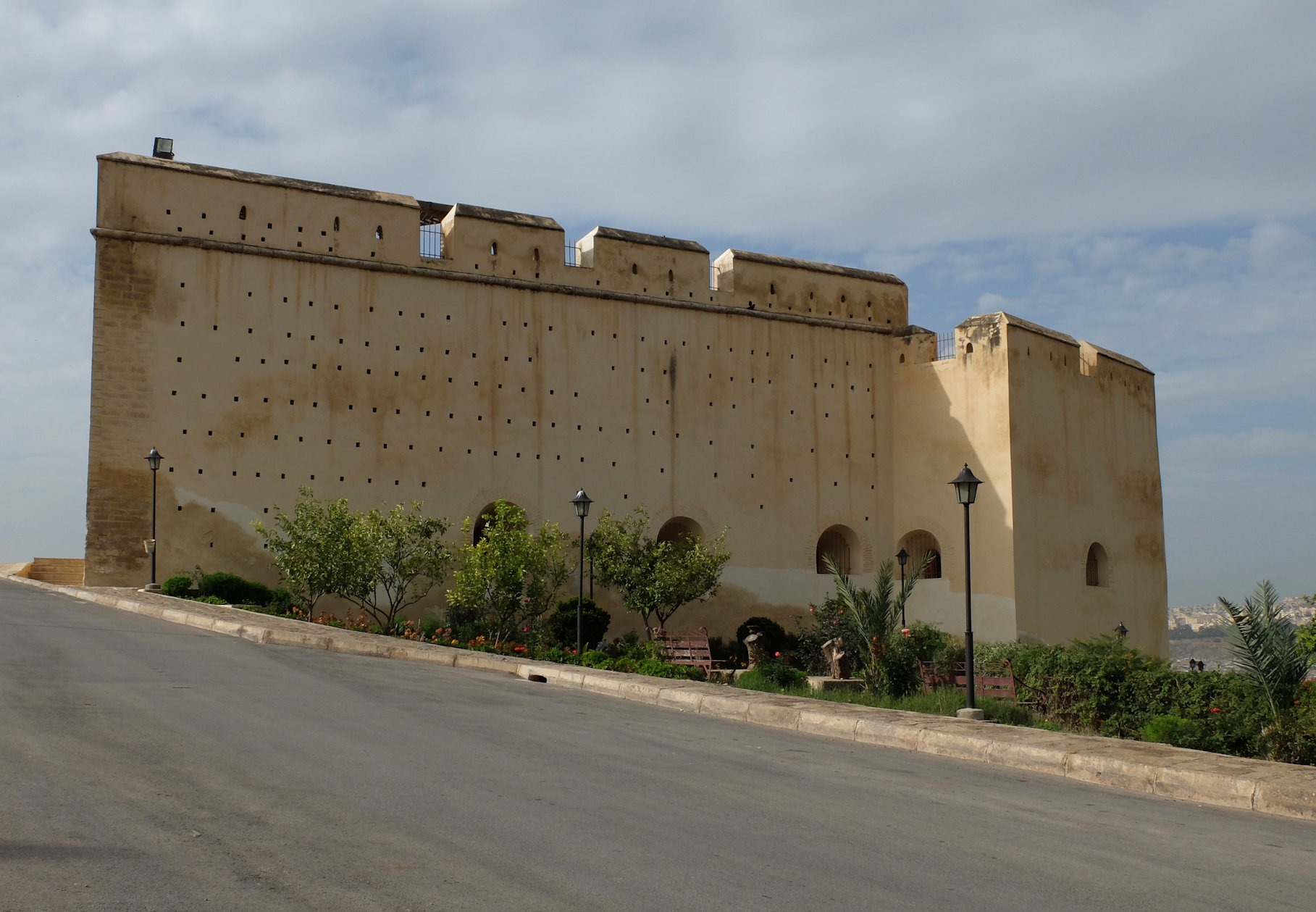
- Interactive map of the Borj Sud area

General information
- Type: fort
- Architectural style: Saadian, Moroccan
- Location: Fez, Morocco
- Coordinates: 34°03′14.3″N 4°58′12.9″W
- Completed: 1582 CE

Technical details
- Material: stone

Borj Sud (Arabic: برج الجنوب, romanized: Burj al-Janub, lit. 'South Tower/Fort') is a fort in the city of Fez, Morocco. It was first established around 1582 by the Saadian dynasty, likely modeled after Portuguese forts of the time. It is located on the hills overlooking the old city (Fes el-Bali) from the south, across the valley from its sister fort, Borj Nord, on the hills to the north of the city. Today it is also known as a prime lookout point over the old city.

== Historical background ==
Like the Borj Nord, the fort was built in 1582 by the powerful Saadian sultan Ahmad al-Mansour. The Saadians, whose capital was Marrakesh, had faced notable resistance to their rule in Fez and the fort is one of several that they built around the city. They were intended to keep the restless population of Fes el-Bali (the old city) under control as much as to actually defend the city from external attacks. Accordingly, the forts were built in commanding positions overlooking the city, from which their canons could easily bombard the city if desired. The Saadians built Borj Nord, Borj Sud, and three bastions along the south and east walls of Fes el-Jdid to emulate Portuguese military architecture; a consequence of their wars to oust the Portuguese from Morocco. Their construction was probably helped by the labour and expertise of European prisoners captured in the famous Battle of the Three Kings in 1578. These are the first and arguably only fortresses in Fez designed for the new age of gunpowder.

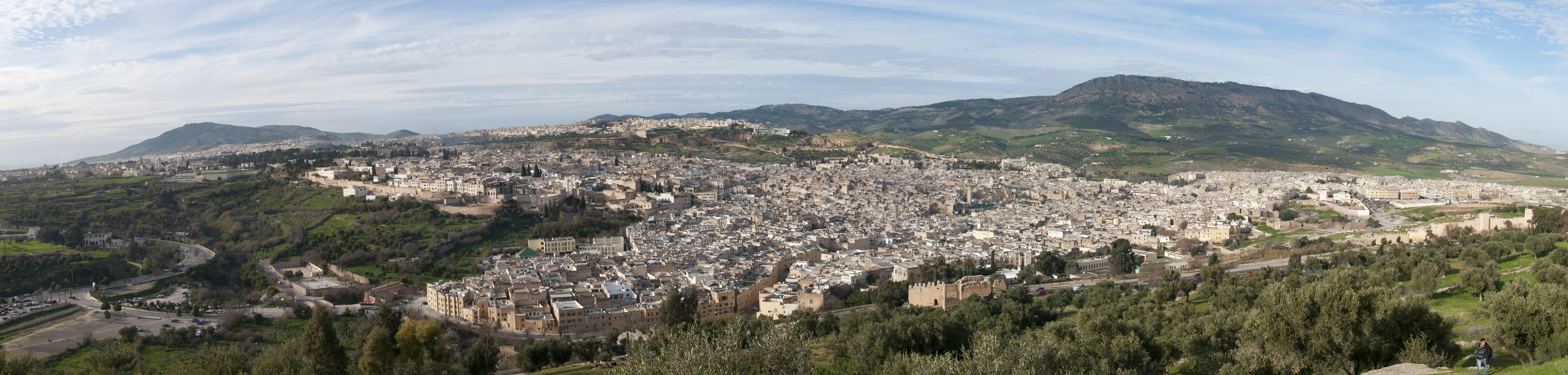
The view of the old city of Fes el-Bali from Borj Sud.

== See also ==
- Marinid Tombs
