= Bab Ftouh =

City gate in Morocco

- باب الفتوح
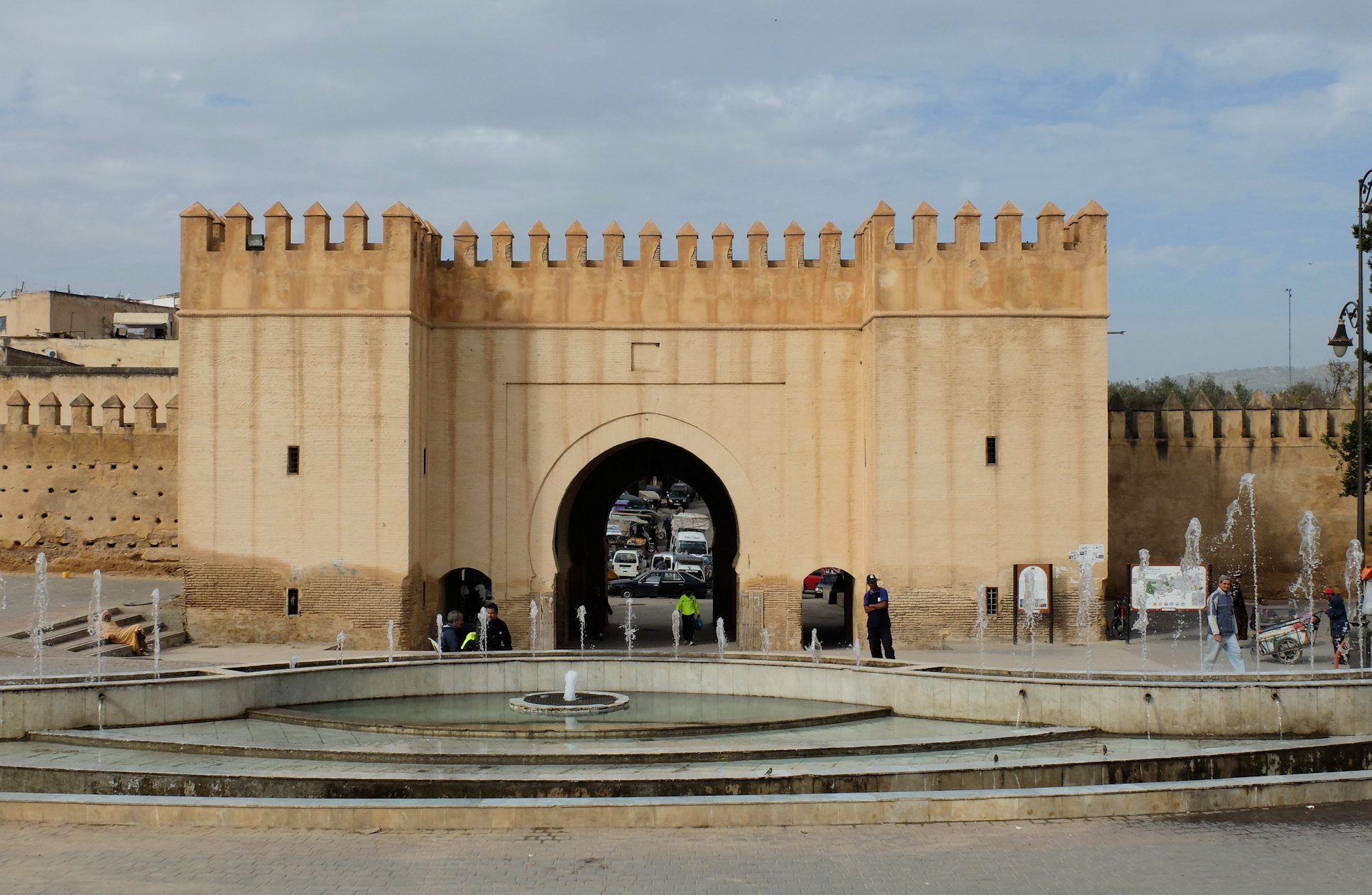
- Bab Ftouh gate (seen from the outside).
- Interactive map of the Bab Ftouh area
- Former names: Bab al-Qibla

General information
- Type: city gate
- Architectural style: Almohad, Moorish, Moroccan
- Location: Fez, Morocco
- Coordinates: 34°03′35.4″N 4°57′55.1″W
- Completed: circa 1212
- Renovated: Between 1757 and 1790

Height
- Height: 15 m (49 ft)

Technical details
- Material: brick and mortar

Bab Ftouh (also spelled Bab Fetouh) is the main southeastern gate of Fes el-Bali, the old walled city of Fes, Morocco.

== History ==
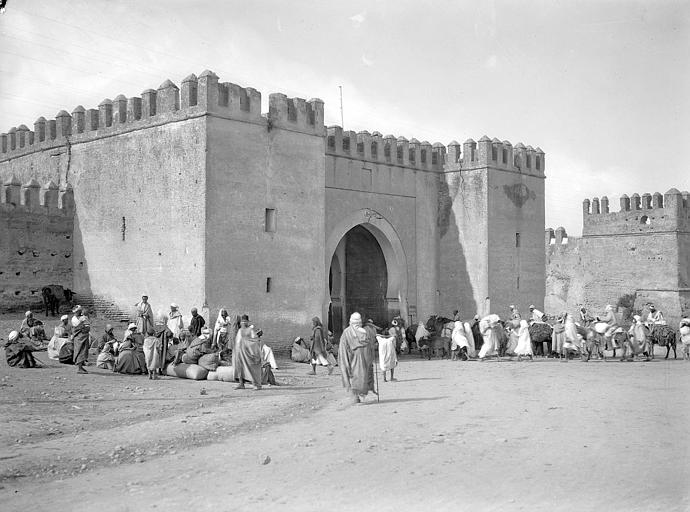
Bab Ftouh in 1925

The name Bab (al-)Ftouh means literally "Gate of the Opening", but historically this name (also used for Bab al-Futuh in Cairo) has been interpreted as "Gate of Conquest" or "Gate of Victory". However, the name of this gate is believed to have originated more directly with the name of a Zenata emir who was himself called al-Fetouh Ibn Dounas and who dominated the early city of Madinat Fas (now the Andalusian Quarter) from 1059 to 1061, back when Fes was still divided into two separate cities. He is said to have built the first gate in this area to go by his name. This gate replaced an earlier Idrisid gate called Bab al-Qibla (named after the fact that the gate lay in the direction of prayer, the qibla, relative to the city center). Al-Fetouh was in rivalry with his brother, 'Ajissa, who controlled the other city, al-'Aliya, on the opposite shore of the river, and who in turn gave his name to the gate known as Bab Guissa. Not long after, in 1069, the twin cities were conquered by the Almoravids and joined into one city with a single set of walls. These were destroyed in 1145 by the Almohad conqueror Abd al-Mu'min but then rebuilt by one of his successors, Muhammad al-Nasir, in 1212.

The current gate thus dates back essentially to the Almohad period, when it was one of the gates in the walls rebuilt by Muhammad al-Nasir. The gate was modified and restored in the 18th century by the Alaouite sultan Muhammad ibn Abdallah. Two other gates used to be located not far from it: Bab Khoukha to the northeast and Bab el-Hamra to the southwest. However, both of these disappeared centuries ago, leaving Bab Ftouh as the only main entrance in this part of the city (until more recent gaps were created for modern roads). In the late 16th century the Saadians built a kasbah (citadel or fortified enclosure), called Kasbah Tamdert, just north of the gate and inside the city walls, most likely to help maintain control over what they saw as a hostile local population.

Today, the area of Bab Ftouh is also a local transport hub for buses and taxis, with the road east to Taza passing here.

== Architecture ==
Despite restorations, the gate has likely preserved its original Almohad design overall. Unlike many other medieval gates to the city, it does not have a bent entrance but provides a straight passage into the old city. It is, however, fortified on either side by two rectangular towers. It is about 15 meters high, making it one of the city's most massive gates. The gate opens through a large horseshoe or moorish arch, surrounded by a shallow rectangular frame (similar to Bab Mahrouk on the other side of the city), flanked by smaller arched openings on either side.

== Bab Ftouh Cemetery ==
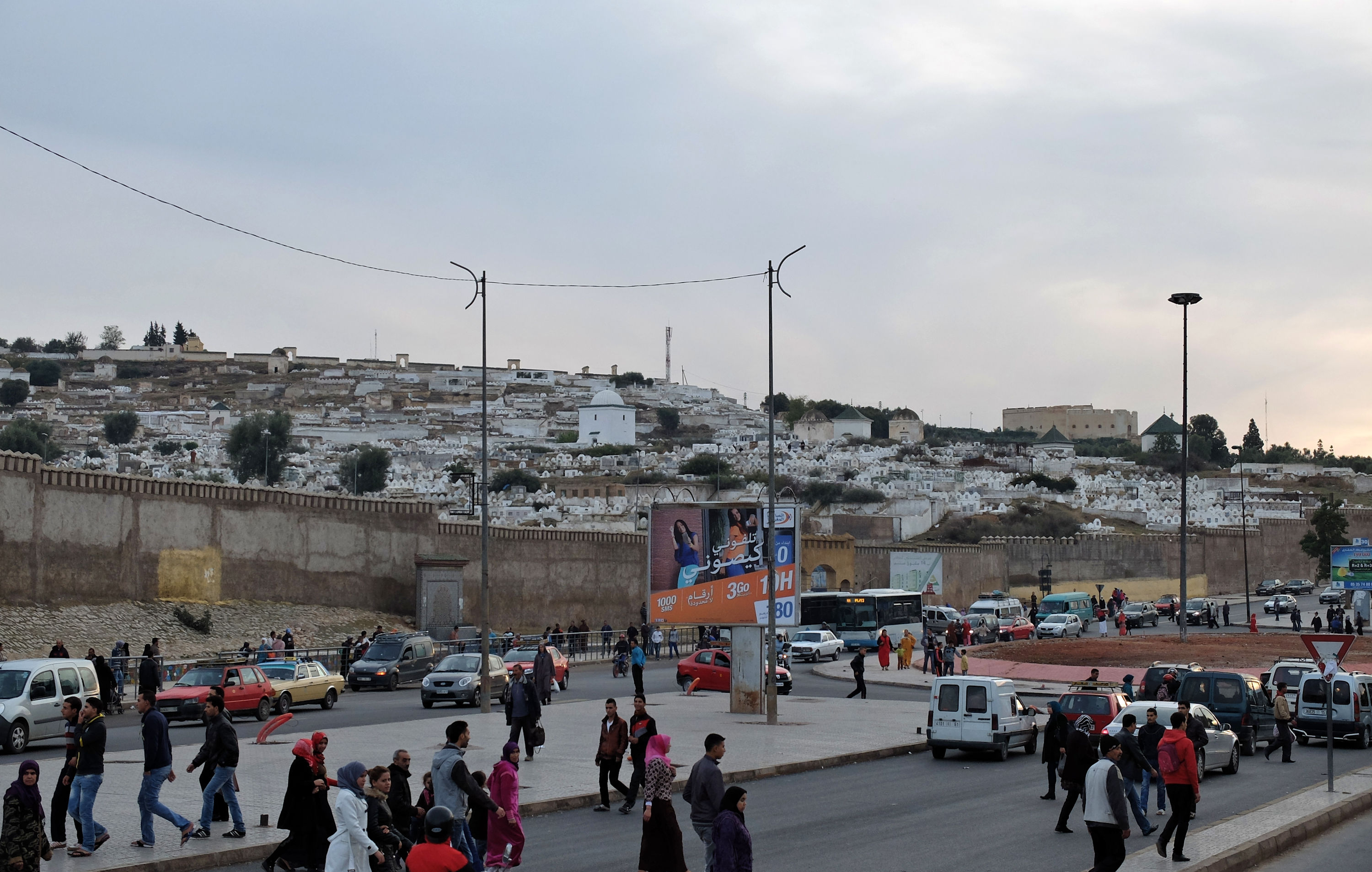
Bab Ftouh Cemetery

Outside the gate, covering a large area on the rising slopes to the south, is the Bab Ftouh Cemetery. It is one of the largest and historically most prestigious cemeteries in Fes, housing the graves of many of Fes's famous and wealthy citizens, as well as a number of local Muslim saints and marabouts. On higher ground, at the top edge of the cemetery, is a wide flat space serving as an outdoor prayer area (msalla) known as the Msalla of the Pasha.

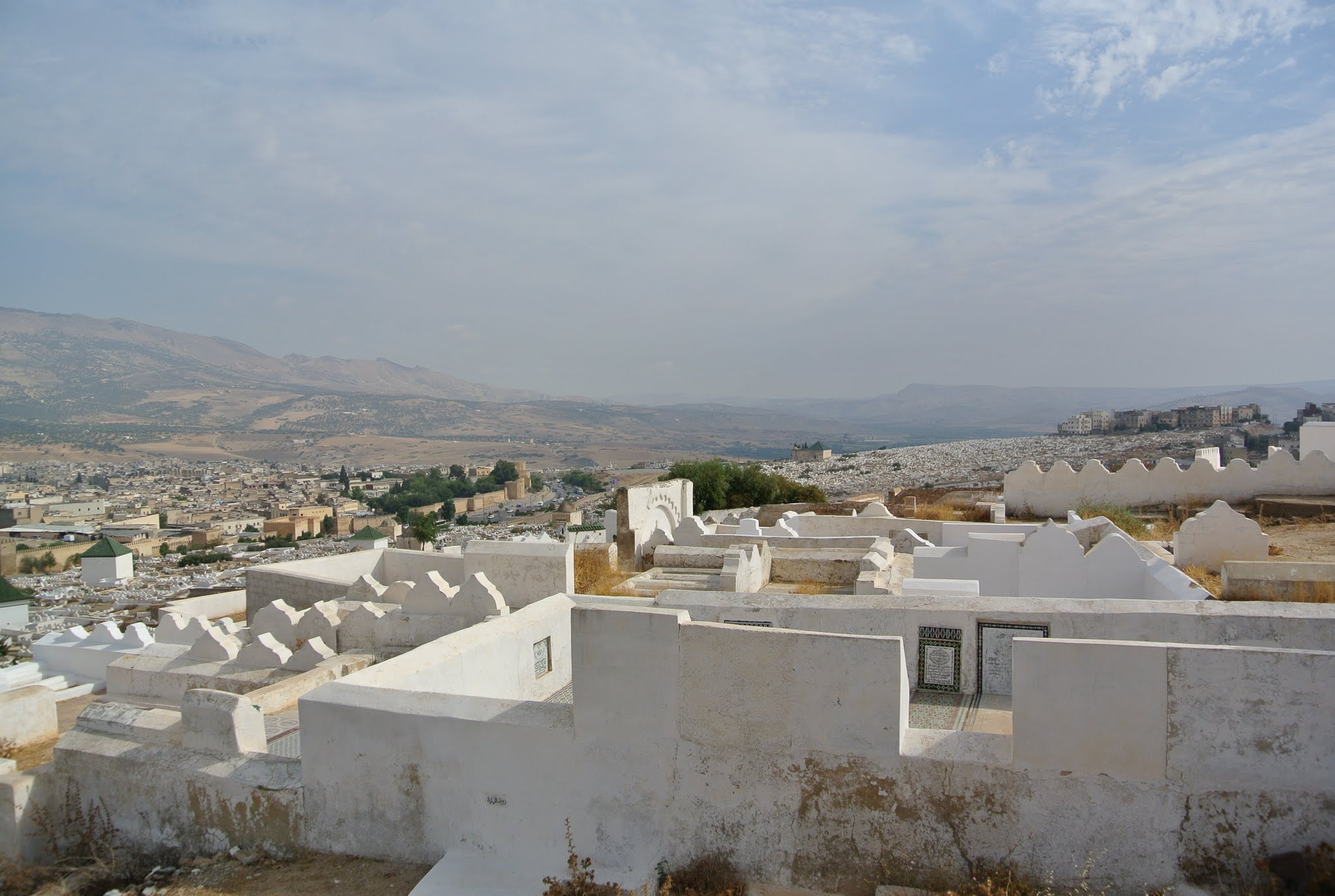
Graves in the Bab Ftouh Cemetery

The cemetery itself is generally divided into two sections. The western part is known as el-Kbab ("the Domes") and includes the domed mausoleums of a number of saints such as Sidi Derras ibn Sma'il. The eastern part is known as Sidi Harazem, after one of the most important local saints buried here: Sidi 'Ali ibn Harazem (or Harzihim), a 12th-century Sufi mystic who died in 1164-65. His mausoleum, marked by a green pyramidal roof, is the most prominent structure here. The founder of the Alaouite dynasty, Moulay Rashid, was buried here in the 17th century. The current structure was built (or rebuilt) by Sultan Mohammed ibn Abdallah in the late 18th century. The tomb of Sidi Harazem is still the subject of a popular moussem (religious festival) every spring and his tomb was historically involved in other popular religious rituals and events.

Another historic cemetery, Bab al-Hamra Cemetery (named after the former city gate located there) also exists inside the city walls, to the west of the Bab Ftouh gate.
