= Mesbahiyya Madrasa =

Madrasa in Fez, Morocco

Coordinates: 34°03′54.7″N 4°58′23.5″W

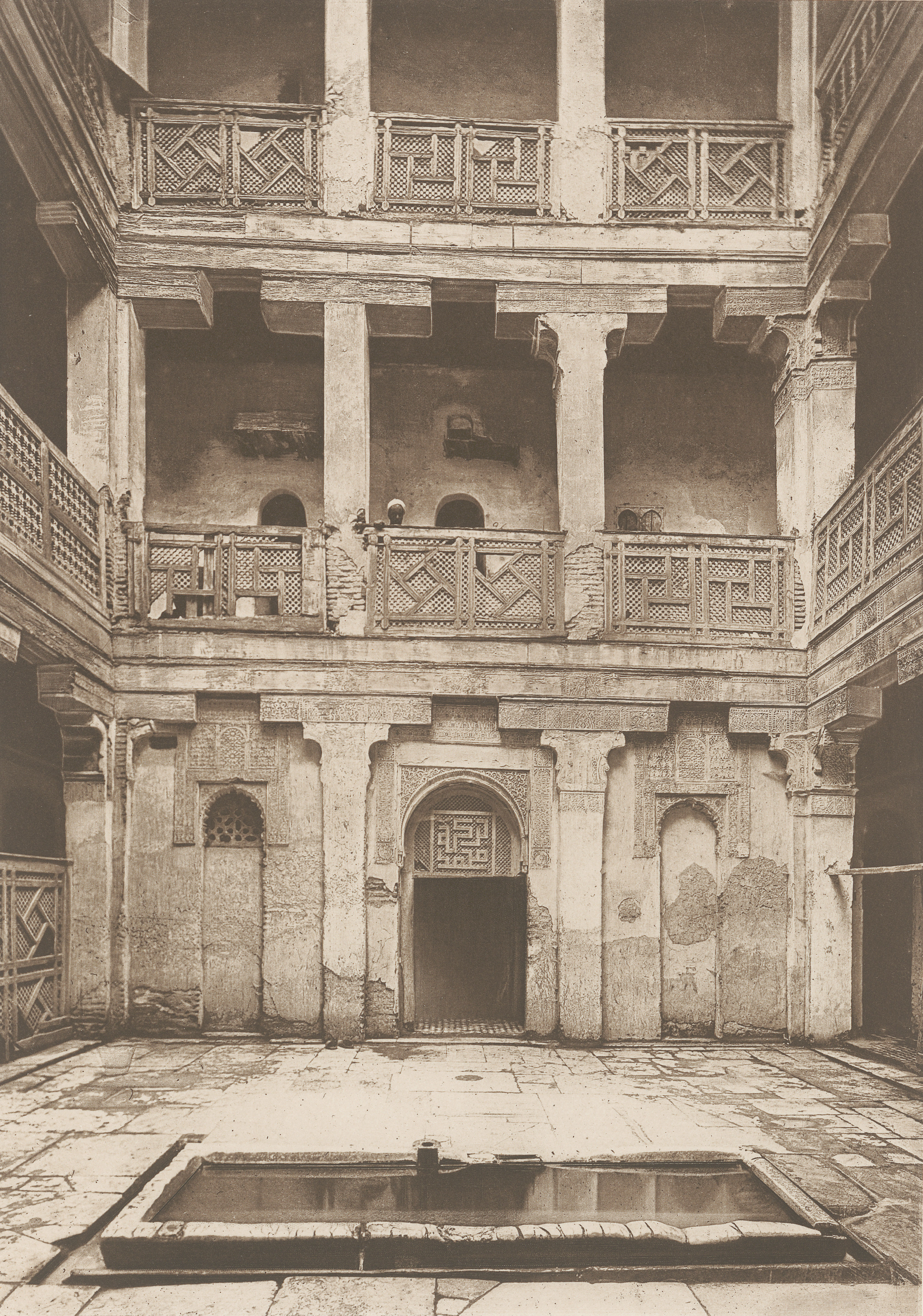
View of the courtyard and the multi-story gallery (photo circa 1921)

Mesbahiyya Madrasa (Arabic: المدرسة المصباحية) is a madrasa in Fes el Bali, the old medina quarter in the city of Fez, Morocco. Its construction is dated to 1346, during the Marinid period. It is located next to the University of al-Qarawiyyin.

== Historical background ==
The madrasa was completed in 1346, during the Marinid period, under the patronage of the Marinid sultan Abu al-Hasan who was a prolific constructor of madrasas in the city. The building owes its name to the faqih (Islamic jurist) Al-Mesbahi, the first faqih who taught in the madrasa. It was distinguished by the white marble used in its construction and decoration, which was imported by Abu al-Hassan from the city of Almeria in al-Andalus (Spain). The extensive use of the marble gave the madrasa its nickname Madrasa ar-Rkham (Arabic: مدرسة الرخام), meaning "school of marble". The maliki jurist Ahmad al-Wansharisi was a professor in this school in the late fifteenth century and taught the Mudawwana and Farʿī Ibn al-Ḥājib.

== Architecture ==
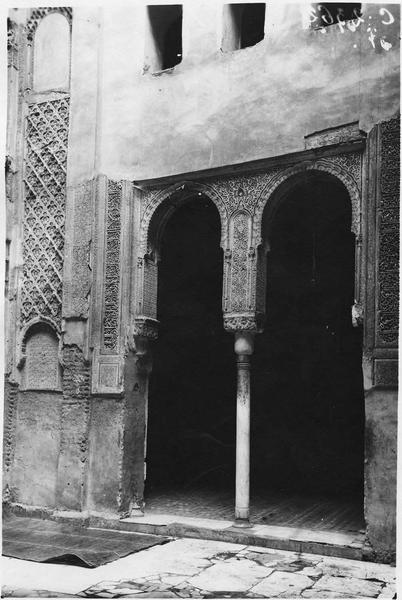
Interior of the madrasa, showing the decorated archway on the north side of the courtyard (photo from 1916)

Centered around a courtyard, the building originally consisted of a ground floor and three upper floors, but the top floor has since been destroyed. On the north side of the courtyard is a large twin-arched opening leading to a square prayer hall. The twin-arched entrance is unique in the context of Marinid architecture and is richly decorated with carved stucco, including a cursive Arabic inscription running in a frame around it. Despite its function, the prayer hall lacks a mihrab. The madrasa could house around 140 students from across the country in 117 rooms across its different floors.

== State of preservation ==
The madrasa has been severely damaged and elements of it have collapsed over time due to neglect and to poor restoration attempts. The dome of the prayer room, the ceiling of the ablutions room, and some other rooms were destroyed, and the iconic marbles have also deteriorated. However, it still retains valuable elements of Marinid motifs and original forms of floral and geometric decorations, and has been undergoing the restoration initiated in the early 1990s. The restoration was finally completed as of 2017 in the context of a wider restoration program for other madrasas and historic monuments in the city. Upon completion of the restoration, the madrasa was earmarked to serve the Qarawiyyin University.
