= Lalla Ghriba Mosque =

Lalla Ghriba Mosque may refer to:

- Lalla Ghriba Mosque, Fez (in Morocco)
- Lalla Ghriba Mosque, Tlemcen (in Algeria)
