= Fes Jdid =

UNESCO World Heritage Site in Fez, Morocco

Coordinates: 34°3′19″N 4°59′25″W

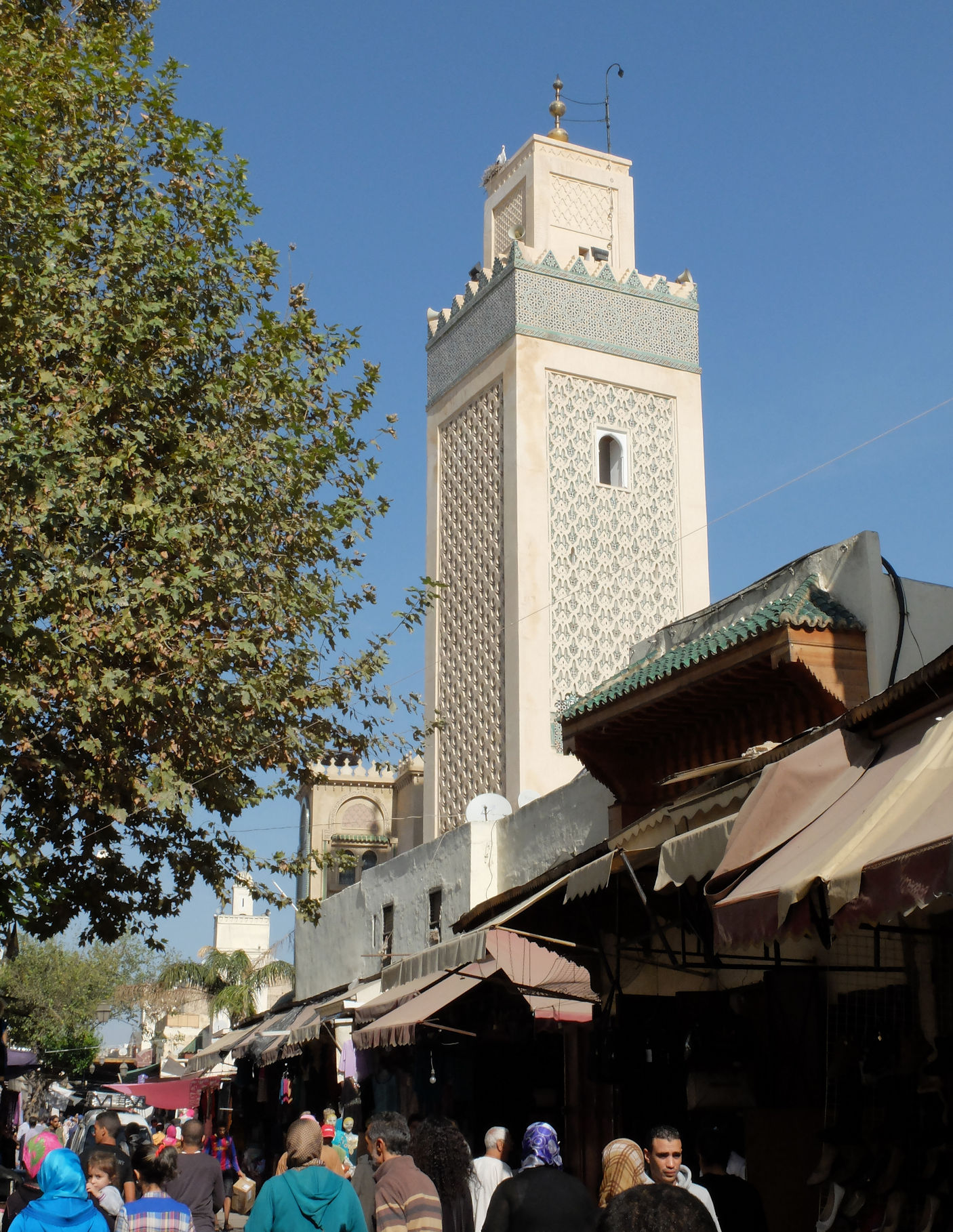
View of the Grande Rue or main street of Fes el-Jdid, with the minaret of the Marinid-era al-Hamra Mosque

Fes Jdid or Fes el-Jdid (Arabic: فاس الجديد, romanized: Fās al-Jadīd, lit. 'New Fez') is one of the three parts of Fez, the second largest city of Morocco. It was founded by the Marinids in 1276 as an extension of Fes el Bali (the old city or medina) and as a royal citadel and capital. It is occupied in large part by the historic Royal Palace (the Dar al-Makhzen), which was once the center of government in Morocco and which is still used on occasion by the King of Morocco today. The district also contains the historic Mellah (Jewish quarter) of the city. Since 1981 it has been classified, along with Fes el-Bali, as a UNESCO World Heritage Site.

== History ==
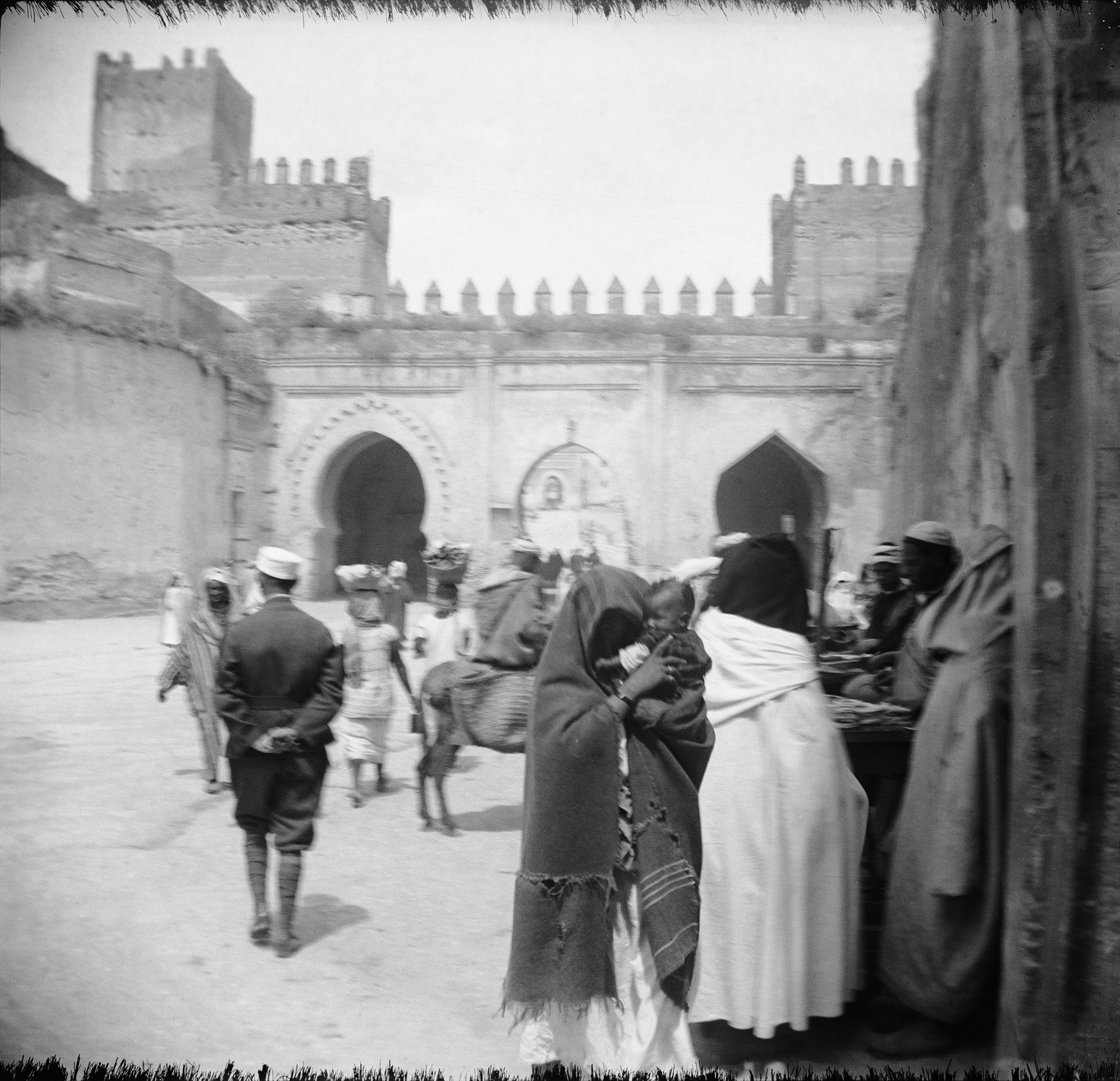
Photo of the Old Mechouar (Vieux Méchouar), the square in front of the Royal Palace's entrance, circa 1920. This was originally the main northern entrance to the city, and the Fes River still passes under it.

=== Marinid period (13th–15th centuries) ===
Fes el-Jdid was founded in 1276 by the Marinid sultan Abu Yusuf Ya'qub. It was to serve as the new royal citadel and center of government for Morocco under Marinid rule, including a Royal Palace (Dar al-Makhzen), military barracks, and residential neighbourhoods. Before then, the main center of power and government in Fes had been the Kasbah Bou Jeloud on the western edge of the old city (at the location of the still extant Bou Jeloud Mosque, near Bab Bou Jeloud gate).

The decision to create a new and highly fortified citadel separate from the old city (Fes el-Bali), may have reflected a continuous wariness of Moroccan rulers towards the highly independent and sometimes restive population of Fes. Another reason for building the new city was that the Almohad kasbahs, which were strictly military compounds, lacked the space required to establish a royal court and to house the Marinid troops. Moreover, by this time Aby Yusuf Ya'qub had also conquered Marrakesh (1269) and defeated the last Almohad holdouts in Tinmal (1275). Building a new palace-city was a frequent preoccupation of North African and Andalusi dynasties wishing to demonstrate their power, and so the foundation of the new city also symbolized the new era of Marinid rule.

The city's original name was Madinat al-Bayda, the "White City". Its construction appears to have been very rapid, as the royal court moved into the new palace barely a year later. The Oued Fes (Fes River; also known in this part as the Oued al-Jawahir, "River of Pearls") flowed along the base of the northern ramparts of the city. Sources also describe that the river, or some of its branches and canals, initially ran through the city itself.

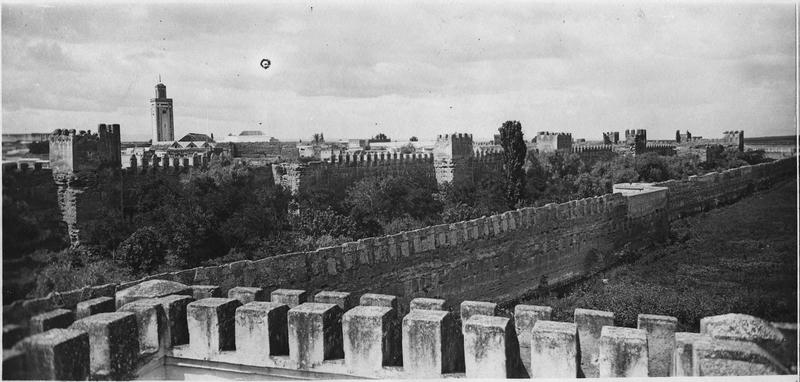
Marinid walls on the northern side of Fes el-Jdid (photographed in 1916)

The Marinid city was protected on all sides by two lines of walls, which on the east and west ran together but to the north and south were separated from each by intervening gardens or districts. What is now called the Old Mechouar (Vieux Méchouar), a large walled square fronting the entrance to the Royal Palace, was originally a fortified bridge over the Fes River set between two gates defending the northern entrance to the city. (Unlike today, the gate on the south side of this bridge/square led to the main city rather than directly to the palace, whose grounds did not yet extend to this point.) The northern gate of this bridge was known as Bab es-Sebaa (now called Bab Dekkakin), while the southern gate was known as the Bab al-Qantara ("Gate of the Bridge") or Bab al-Oued ("Gate of the River"). The relative importance of this northern entrance was likely due to the presence of the road to Meknes (the closest major city). From Bab al-Qantara the city's main street (now known as the Grande Rue de Fes el Jdid) ran directly to the southern gate, Bab 'Oyun Sanhaja (now called Bab Semmarine).

The Grand Mosque of Fes el-Jdid, adjacent to the palace grounds, was built around 1276 during the new city's foundation, and was connected by a private passage directly to the palace, allowing the sultan to come and go for prayers. The main Muslim neighbourhoods to the east of the Dar al-Makhzen appear to have developed progressively over the Marinid period and were each centered around their own main mosque, such as the al-Hamra Mosque (located on the main street, now called the Grande Rue), the Lalla az-Zhar Mosque (to the southwest) and the Lalla Ghriba Mosque (further east).

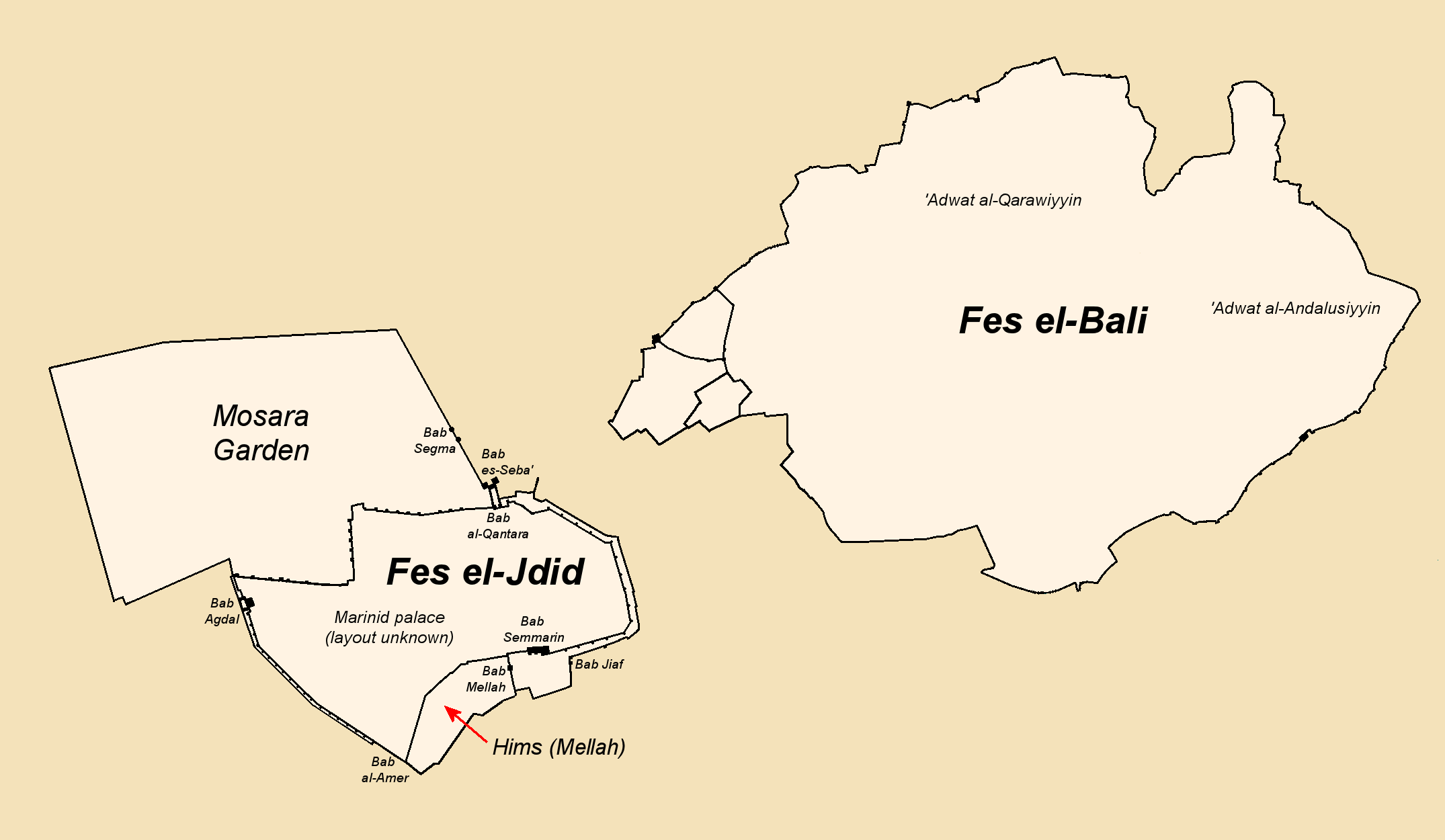
Location and possible layout of Fes el-Jdid and the Mosara Garden in the 14th century, during the Marinid period, relative to Fes el-Bali

==== The Marinid Royal Gardens ====
Abu Yusuf Ya'qub had also wished to create a vast pleasure garden hut he died in 1286 before this could be accomplished. His son and successor, Abu Ya'qub Yusuf, carried out the work instead in 1287. He enlisted an Andalusian engineer, Ibn al-Hajj from Seville, to help create a vast garden covering 67 hectares to the north of Fes el-Jdid and the royal palace, known as the Mosara Garden. The water for the gardens was drawn from the Oued Fes via a huge noria (waterwheel) measuring 26 metres in diameter and 2 metres wide. The noria, sometimes referred to as the "Grand Noria", delivered the water into an aqueduct attached to Bab Dekkakin. From Bab Dekkakin, the aqueduct then carried the water to Bab Segma further north, and from there it was carried further into three large square basins spread across the gardens. Also located inside the gardens was a msalla, an open-air prayer area, known as the Msalla of the Sultan or the Msalla of Bab Segma. The gardens fell into ruin and eventually disappeared in subsequent centuries, most likely during the neglect of Fes throughout the Saadian period (16th–17th centuries), but traces of its structures have survived to modern times. The site of the garden is now mostly occupied by the large Bab Segma Cemetery (probably dating from the time of Moulay Rashid), inside of which the outline of some of the original basins can still be discerned.

==== Creation of the Jewish Mellah ====
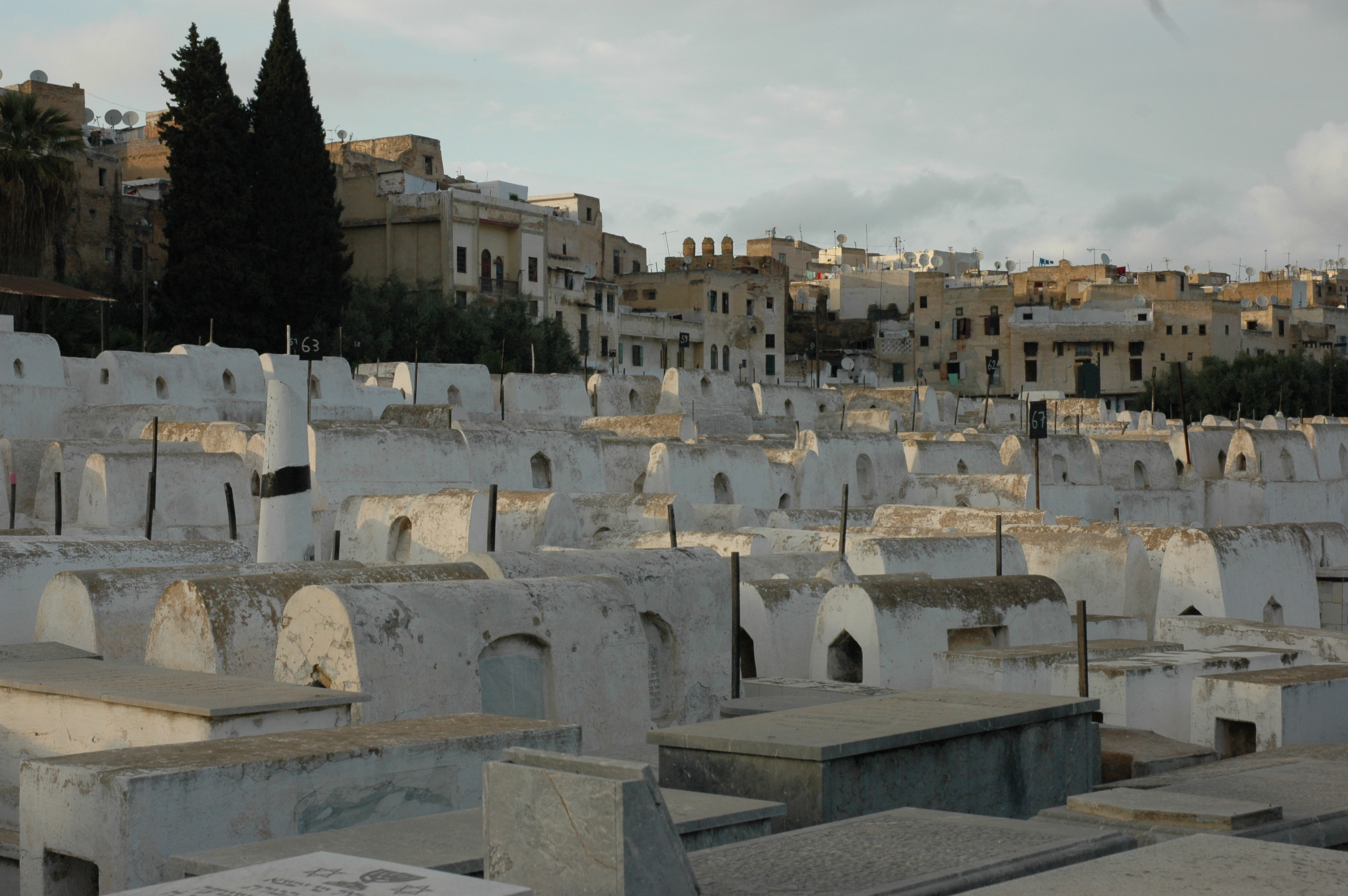
The Jewish Cemetery in the Mellah

Fes also hosted the largest and one of the oldest Jewish communities in Morocco. During the Marinid period the Jewish inhabitants, who had until then lived alongside the Muslim population in Fes el-Bali, were all moved to a new district occupying the south side of Fes el-Jdid. This district, possibly built after the initial foundation of the city, was located between the inner and outer southern walls of the city and was originally inhabited by Muslim garrisons, notably by the Sultan's contingents of Syrian archers. The district was known as Hims, named after Homs in Syria, or by the name Mellah (Arabic: ملاح, lit. 'salt'), due to either a saltwater source or a former salt warehouse in the area. The latter name was later retained as the name of the Jewish quarter. This was the first "mellah" in Morocco; a name and phenomenon that came to be replicated in many other cities in the country. (A notable exception to this was the nearby town of Sefrou.)

Both the exact reasons and the exact date for the creation of the Jewish Mellah of Fes are debated by scholars. Broader political motivations for moving the Jewish community to Fes el-Jdid, closer to the royal palace, may have included the Marinid rulers' desire to take more direct advantage (or control) of their merchant and artisan skills and of their commercial relations with Jewish communities in other countries (which could act as an avenue for foreign relations). Historical accounts confirm that in the mid-14th century the Jews of Fes were still living in Fes el-Bali but that by the end of the 16th century they were well-established in the Mellah of Fes el-Jdid. Some authors argue that the transfer likely happened in stages across the Marinid period, particularly following episodes of violence or repression against Jews in the old city. The urban fabric of the Mellah appears to have developed progressively and it's possible that a small Jewish population settled here right after the foundation of Fes el-Jdid and that other Jews fleeing the Fes el-Bali joined them later. Some authors attribute the move more specifically to a consequence of the "rediscovery" of Idris II's body in his zawiya at the center of the city in 1437. Following this, the area around the mosque was turned into a horm (sanctuary) where non-Muslims were not allowed to enter, resulting in the expulsion of the Jewish inhabitants from the city's commercial center. Many scholars therefore estimate that the move took place in the mid-15th century. The Mellah's Jewish cemetery was established at its western edge (the current site of Place des Alaouites) on land which was donated to the Jewish community by a Marinid princess named Lalla Mina in the 15th century.

=== Post-Marinid period (16th–19th centuries) ===
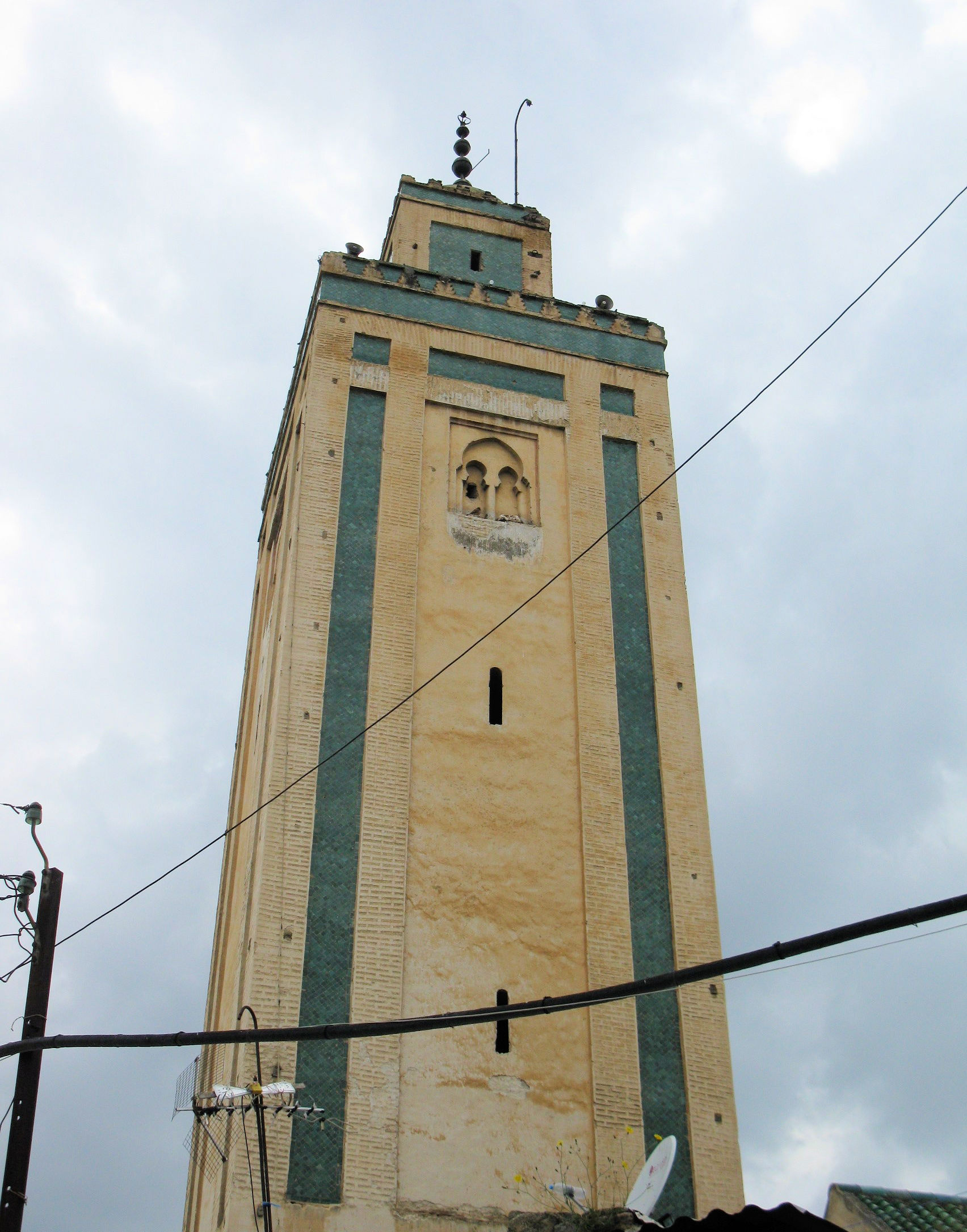
The minaret of the Moulay Abdallah Mosque (18th century)

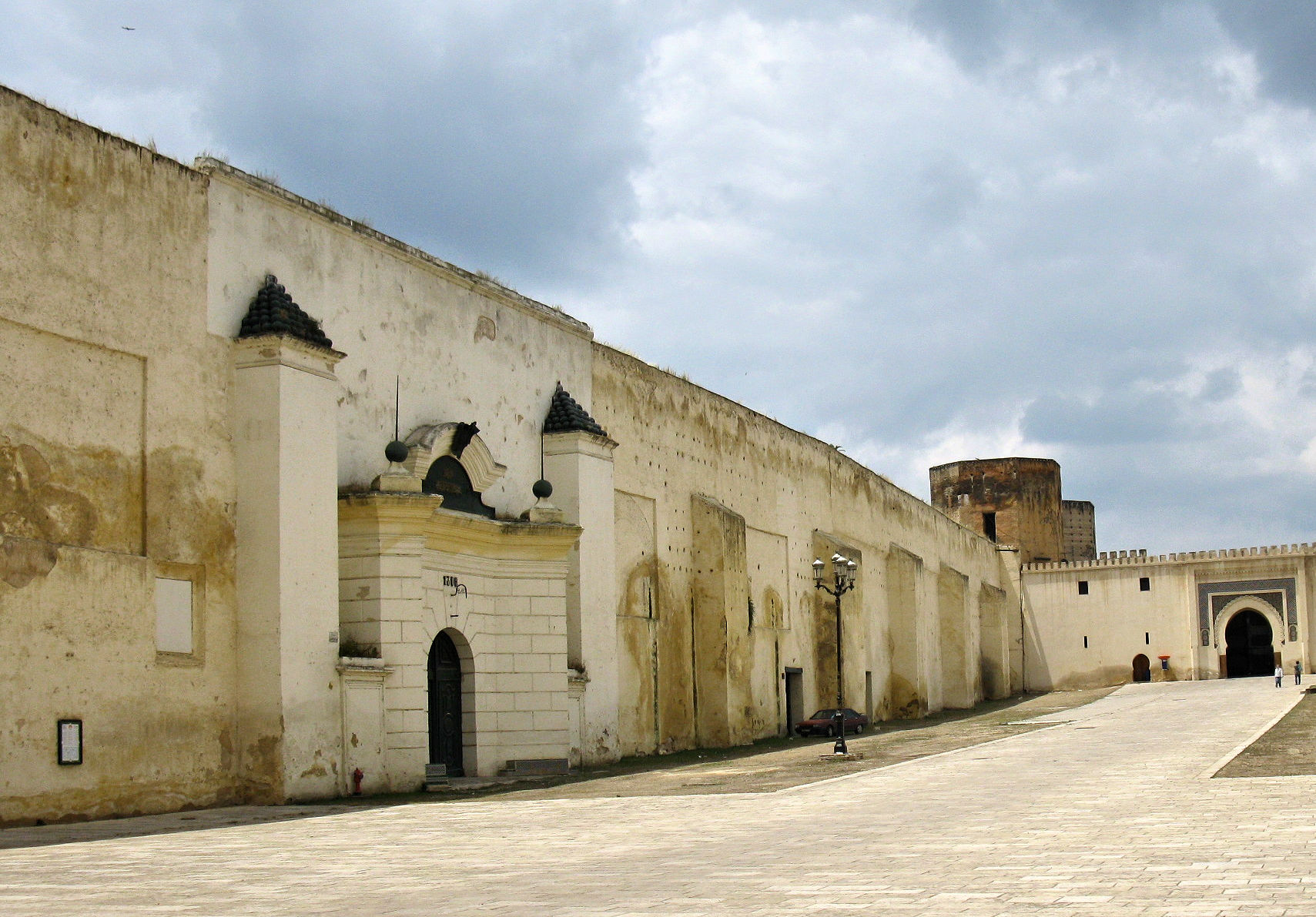
The gate of the 19th-century Dar al-Makina (left) at the New Mechouar. This wall also incorporates remains of the aqueduct which once brought water to the Marinid royal gardens.

Fes el-Jdid, along with Fes el-Bali, entered a period of relative neglect after the Marinid decline and under the rule of the Saadians, who made Marrakech their capital and seemed to view the population of Fes with suspicion. The Saadians' main contribution was the construction of several imposing military bastions around the city, such as Borj Nord and Borj Sud overlooking Fes el-Bali. In Fes el-Jdid they added three bastions to the already formidable city walls on its eastern side; namely, those known as Borj Sheikh Ahmed, Borj Twil, and Borj Sidi Bou Nafa'. The western walls of the city, near Bab Agdal, were also given extra fortifications. It was only with the rise of the Alaouite dynasty that Fes became the capital again and reclaimed some of its prosperity. Further important developments took place in Fes el-Jdid during this period.

In 1671, the first Alaouite Sultan Moulay Rashid ordered the creation of a vast rectangular courtyard in the eastern part of the palace. This addition extended the Dar al-Makhzen grounds up to the edge of the Lalla ez-Zhar Mosque which had previously stood in the middle of a residential neighbourhood, cutting off one of the local streets. This was one of several occasions where the expansion of the palace cut into the general residential areas of Fes el-Jdid. Moulay Rashid also built the vast Kasbah Cherarda north of Fes el-Jdid in order to house his tribal troops. The housing of troops here also liberated new space in Fes el-Jdid itself, including the northwestern area which became the new Moulay Abdallah neighbourhood from the early 18th century onwards. This is where Sultan Moulay Abdallah (ruled between 1729 and 1757) erected a large mosque and royal necropolis for the Alaouite dynasty. Abdallah's successor, Sultan Mohammed ben Abdallah (ruled 1748 and 1757–1790), was responsible, according to some sources, for establishing the New Mechouar (north of the Old Mechouar); though other scholars attribute this to Moulay Hassan a century later.

The Alaouite period also saw periods of turmoil and regression. From 1790 to 1792 Sultan Moulay Yazid, largely seen as a cruel leader, forced the entire Jewish community to move from the Mellah to the outlying Kasbah Cherarda on the other side of Fes el-Jdid. The Mellah was occupied by tribal troops allied to him, its main synagogue was replaced by a mosque, and the Jewish cemetery and its contents were moved to a cemetery near Bab Guissa. Moreover, Moulay Yazid permanently reduced the size of the Mellah district by demolishing the old city walls around it and rebuilding them along a much shorter perimeter we see today. It was only after the sultan's death that the chief Muslim qadi (judge) of Fes ordered the Mellah to be restored to the Jewish community.

Major expansions and modifications to Fes el-Jdid and to the royal palace continued throughout the 19th century. Under sultan Moulay Abd al-Rahman (ruled 1822–1859) the Bab Bou Jat Mechouar or Grand Mechouar was created to the west of the Moulay Abdallah quarter, providing the palace grounds with another ceremonial entrance to the northwest. This led to the western gate of the Moulay Abdallah quarter, Bab Bou Jat, eventually being closed off. A large garden area on the west side of the palace, the Lalla Mina Gardens, was also established by Moulay Abd al-Rahman, stretching to the old Marinid western walls of the city. To the west of these an even larger walled garden called the Agdal was established by Sultan Moulay Hassan I. Moulay Hassan also connected Fes el-Jdid and Fes el-Bali (the old city) for the first time with a broad corridor of walls, and inside this space he commissioned a number of royal gardens such as Jnan Sbil and summer palaces such as Dar Batha. Additionally, he constructed the Dar al-Makina, a modern arms factory, on the west side of the New Mechouar (which he likely also established). Lastly, it seems to have been under Moulay Hassan that the Dar al-Makhzen grounds were extended up to the south gate of the Old Mechouar, thus turning it into the main entrance of the palace, diverting the northern end of the main street of Fes el-Jdid, and cutting off the Moulay Abdallah district from the rest of the city. The Oued Fes, which flowed just outside the northern walls of the city, was diverted northward in the course of these 19th-century expansions, but continues to pass under the Old Mechouar before reemerging on its east side.

=== 20th century to present day ===
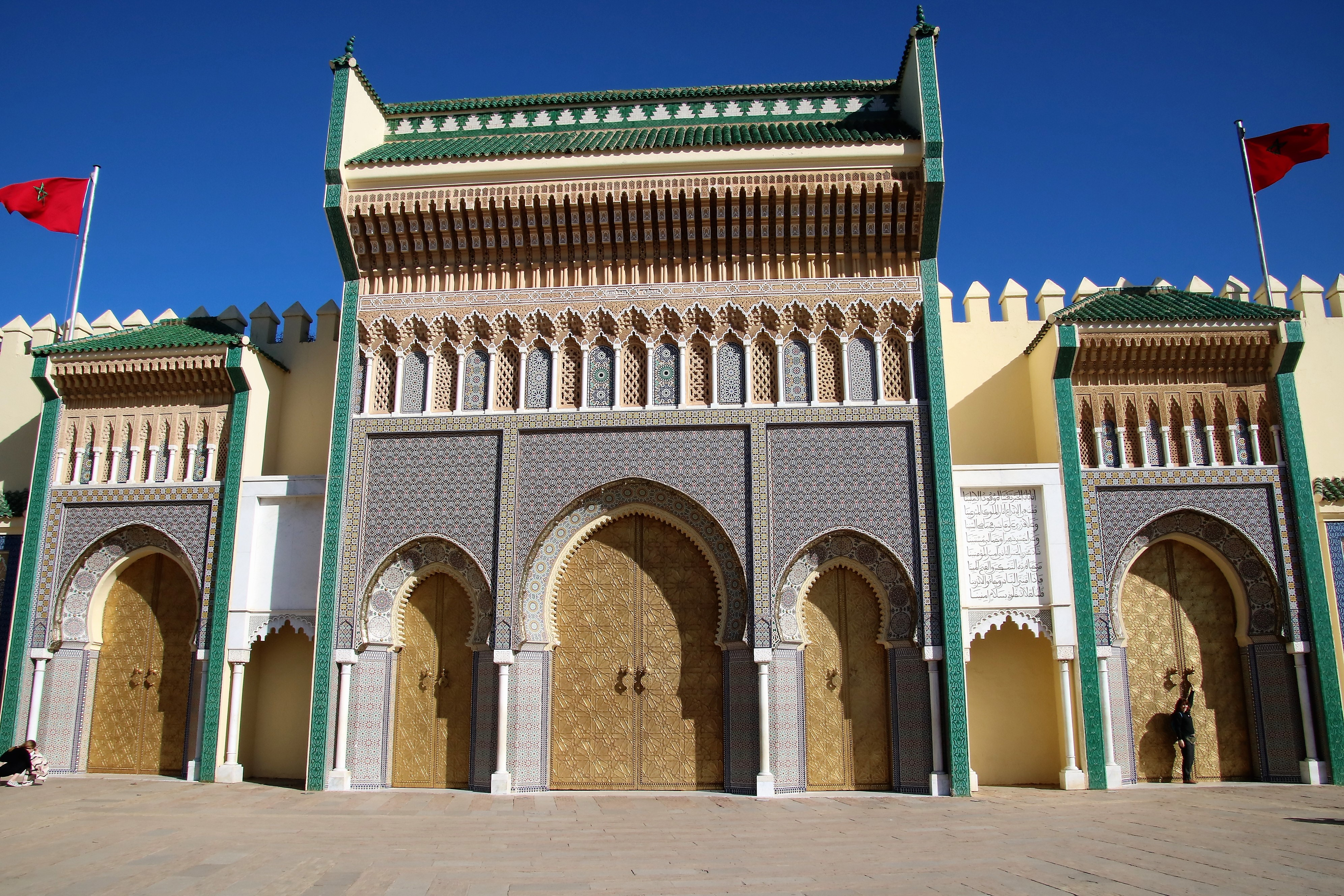
The Gates of the Royal Palace (Dar al-Makhzen). These gates were crafted in the 20th century when King Hassan II moved the main entrance of the palace to the southwest.

In 1912 French colonial rule was instituted over Morocco following the Treaty of Fes. One immediate consequence was the 1912 riots in Fes, a popular uprising which included deadly attacks targeting Europeans as well as native Jewish inhabitants in the Mellah, followed by an even deadlier repression. Fes and its Dar al-Makhzen ceased to be the center of power in Morocco as the capital was moved to Rabat. A number of social and physical changes took place at this period and across the 20th century. Starting under Lyautey, the creation of the French Ville Nouvelle ("New City") to the west also had a wider impact on the entire city's development.

In the Bab al-Amer area, the French administration judged the old gate too narrow and inconvenient for traffic and demolished a nearby aqueduct and some of the surrounding wall in order to improve access. In the process they created a vast open square on the site of the former Jewish cemetery (which in 1894 had been moved to the southeast) which became known as Place du Commerce and which is now known as Place des Alaouites. In 1924, the French went further and demolished a series of modest shops and stables on the northern edge of the Jewish Mellah in order to build a wide road for vehicles (Rue Boukhessissat or Bou Khsisat; later also Rue des Mérinides) between the Mellah and the southern wall of the Royal Palace, which today passes in front of Bab Semmarine and continues towards Fes el-Bali. The former shops were replaced with more ostentatious boutiques built in the architectural style of the Jewish houses of the Mellah, with many open balconies and outward ornamentation. Bab Semmarine itself was also altered and opened up to increase the flow of traffic. Elsewhere in the city changes were less dramatic. One unusual French policy was the designation of the Moulay Abdallah quarter as a red light district.

The population of the city increased significantly over time (as elsewhere in Morocco): between 1936 and 1948, the population of the Moulay Abdallah quarter went from 5,508 to 9,500 and the population of Fes el-Jdid proper (i.e. the main area between Bab Semmarine and Bab Dekkakine) went from 9,622 to 26,500. By contrast, however, the Mellah also became steadily depopulated of its Jewish inhabitants, who either moved to the Ville Nouvelle, to Casablanca, or emigrated to countries like France, Canada, and Israel. In the late 1940s, estimates of the Jewish population include 15,150 in the Mellah and 22,000 in all of Fes. However, major waves of emigration after this have essentially depleted the Jewish community, with no functioning synagogues remaining in the Mellah. In 1997 there were reportedly only 150 Jews in all of Fes.

In the late 1960s and early 1970s, King Hassan II ordered the creation of a new entrance to the Royal Palace at Place des Alaouites, at which time the now-famous gates of the palace were constructed here. Although no longer the primary official residence of the monarchy, the Palace is still used as a residence by the King of Morocco to this day.

== Layout ==
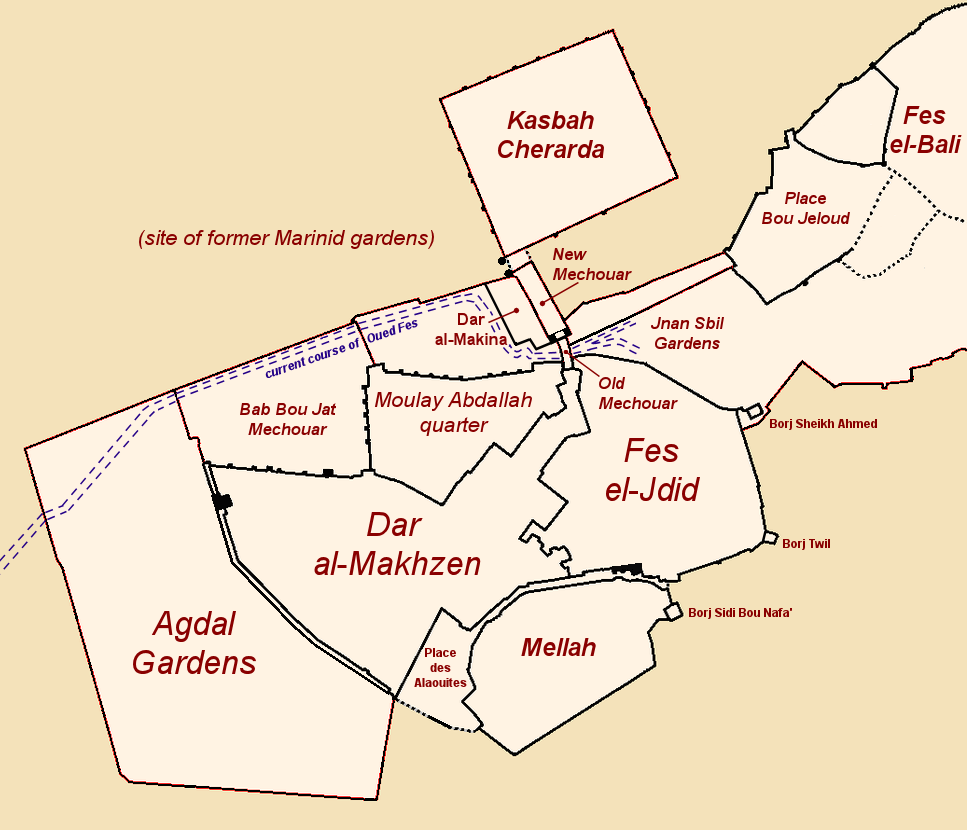
Layout of Fes el-Jdid today, including the Dar al-Makhzen (Royal Palace) and the current course of the Oued Fes (Fes River) in the area

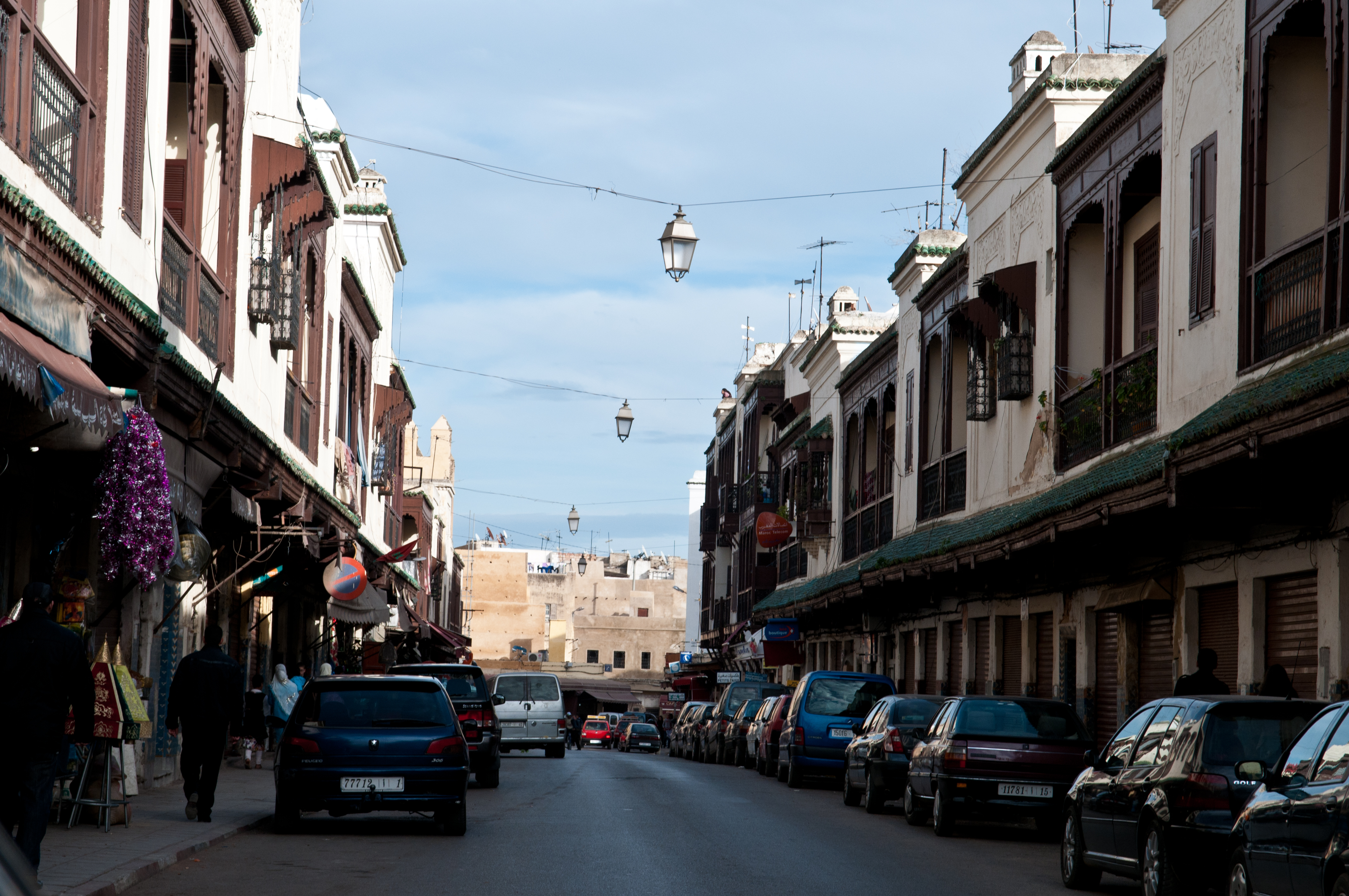
Rue des Mérinides (formerly also Rue Boukhessissat), created in 1924 on the northern edge of the old Jewish quarter (Mellah)

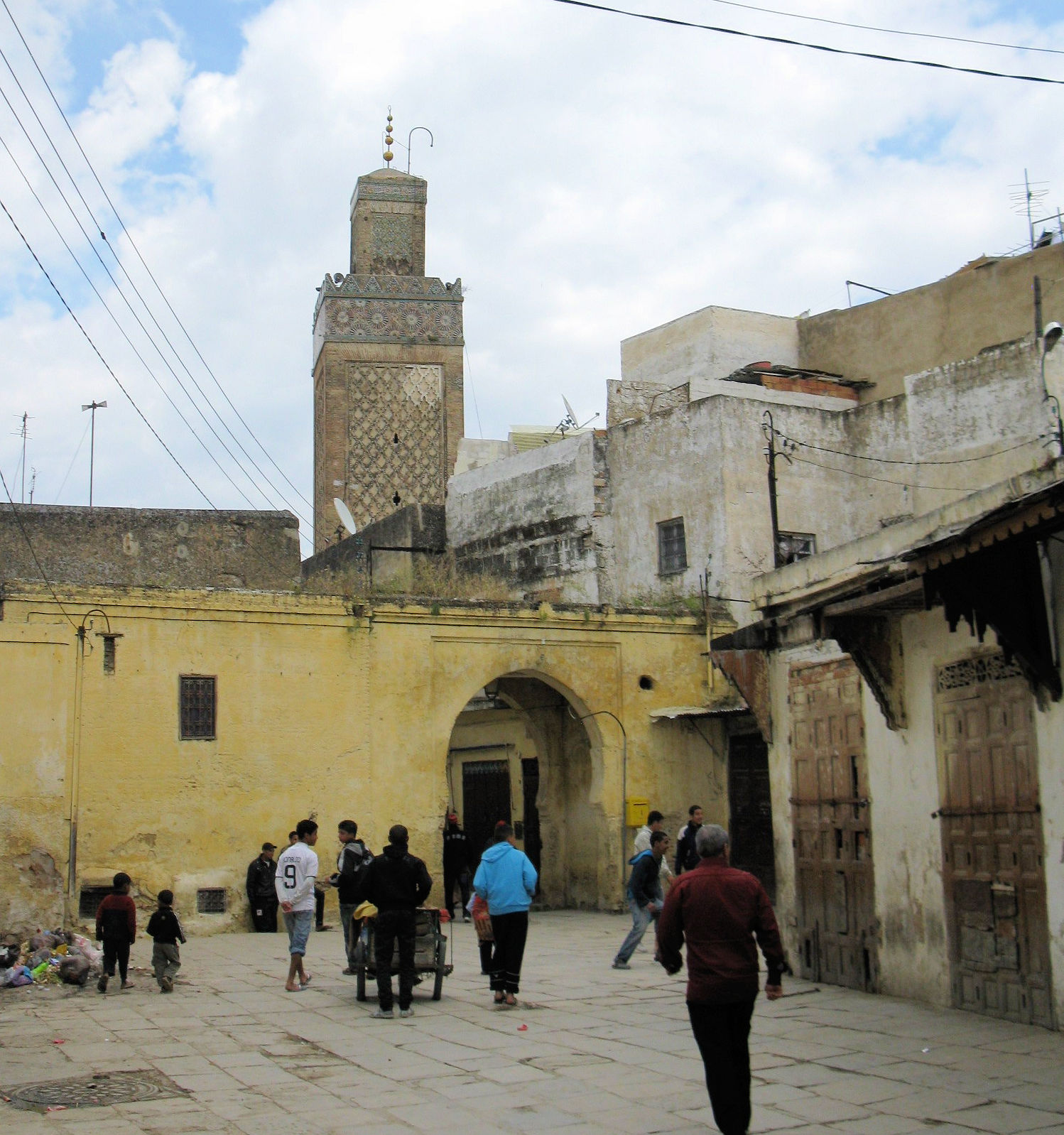
The Moulay Abdallah quarter, with the minaret of the Grand Mosque of Fes el-Jdid visible

Today, the layout of Fes el-Jdid appears complicated due to the multiple expansions and modifications of its districts and of the Royal Palace (Dar al-Makhzen) over the centuries. The area of the Dar al-Makhzen alone occupies about 80 hectares and is the largest division of the city within its walls.

=== Southern area ===
Approaching from the west (from the modern Ville Nouvelle or "New City"), the city's main entrance is at Bab al-Amer, on the western edge of the former Jewish Mellah. This is also the location of the modern Place des Alaouites ("Plaza/Square of the Alaouites") and of the famous Gates of the Royal Palace, which were built in the 1960s and early 70s but are much-celebrated for their craftsmanship. From this point, a main road (Rue des Mérinides or Rue Boukhessissat) runs eastwards between the Mellah and the walls of the Royal Palace. This area, along with the rest of the former Jewish quarter, is also known for its distinctive house architecture, with open balconies and other features not usually found in the traditional Muslim medina. The Mellah in turn has its own main street, a gate known as Bab el-Mellah, and a large Jewish Cemetery (established in 1883) at its southwestern corner.

=== Central and eastern areas ===
Rue des Mérinides, the main street for road vehicles, passes in front of Bab Semmarine, a monumental gate which constitutes the southern entrance to Fes el-Jdid proper. From this gate, a main street known as the Grande Rue de Fès el-Jdid, lined with shops and markets, runs north to northwest until it reaches the Old Mechouar, the fortified square fronting the historic entrance to the Dar al-Makhzen. On either side of the Grande Rue are residential neighbourhoods, historically the main Muslim neighbourhoods of Fes el-Jdid, which are centered around historic main mosques such as the al-Hamra Mosque, the Lalla ez-Zhar Mosque, and the Lalla Ghriba Mosque. The eastern edge of these neighbourhoods is lined by the former walls of Fes el-Jdid, of which major sections have survived, in addition to several Saadian-era bastions. Some of these can be seen clearly from the Jnan Sbil Gardens.

=== Northern area ===
At the Old Mechouar several roads converge. On the south side of the square is the entrance to the Royal Palace (off-limits to the public), while on the north side is the massive gate of Bab Dekkakin which leads to the New Mechouar. On the east side of the square are entrances from the Grande Rue and another separate opening for the road leading to Place Bou Jeloud and Fes el-Bali. On the west side of the square, a small gateway constitutes the main access to the Moulay Abdallah quarter, via a winding road which also passes the Grand Mosque of Fes el-Jdid (the city's historic royal mosque). The Fes River still flows beneath the Old Mechouar, and reemerges on its east side into the Jnan Sbil Gardens.

=== Northwestern area ===
The Moulay Abdallah quarter is centered around the large 18th-century Moulay Abdallah Mosque. It has another entrance to the northwest as well. This is also where western extensions were made of the Royal Palace. In the early 20th century, during the French Protectorate (1912–1956), it was designated a red-light district. West of this district there are the more recent extensions of the Royal Palace: a large square or open space known as Bab Bou Jat Mechouar, and beyond this vast walled gardens of the Agdal (off-limits to the public).

== Landmarks ==
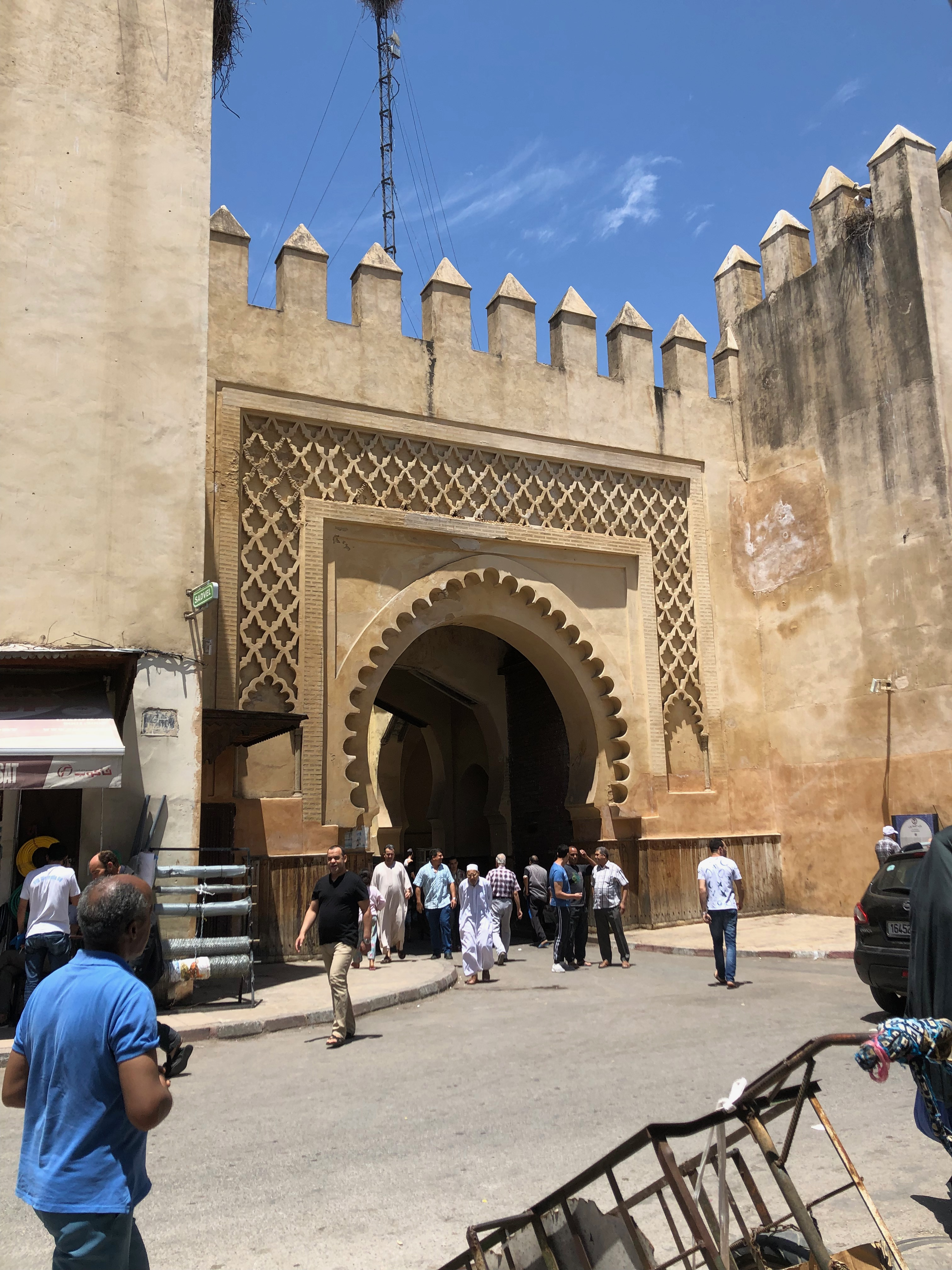
Bab Semmarine, the main southern gate of Fes el-Jdid

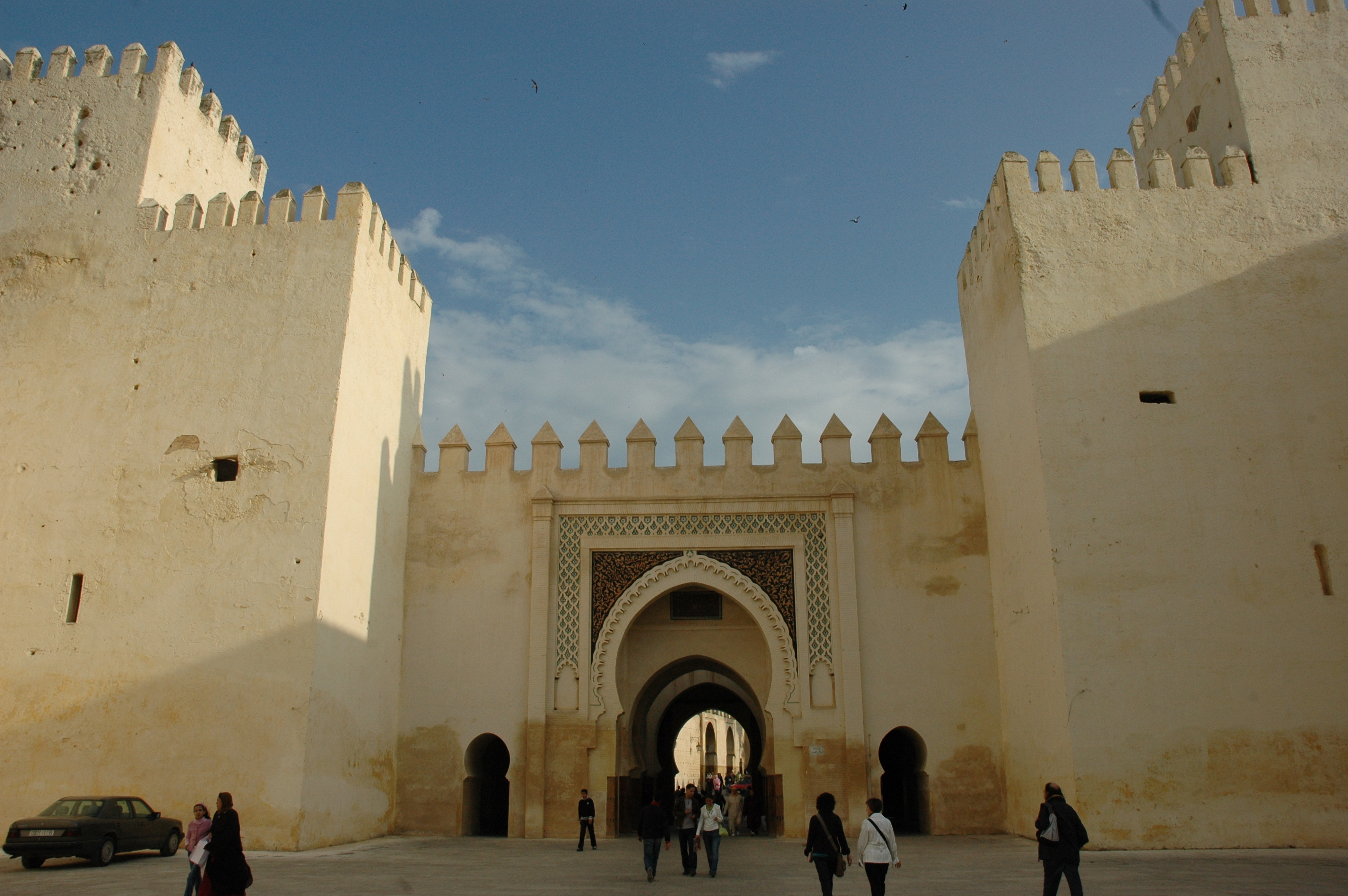
Bab Dekkakin (also known as Bab Sebaa), in the New Mechouar

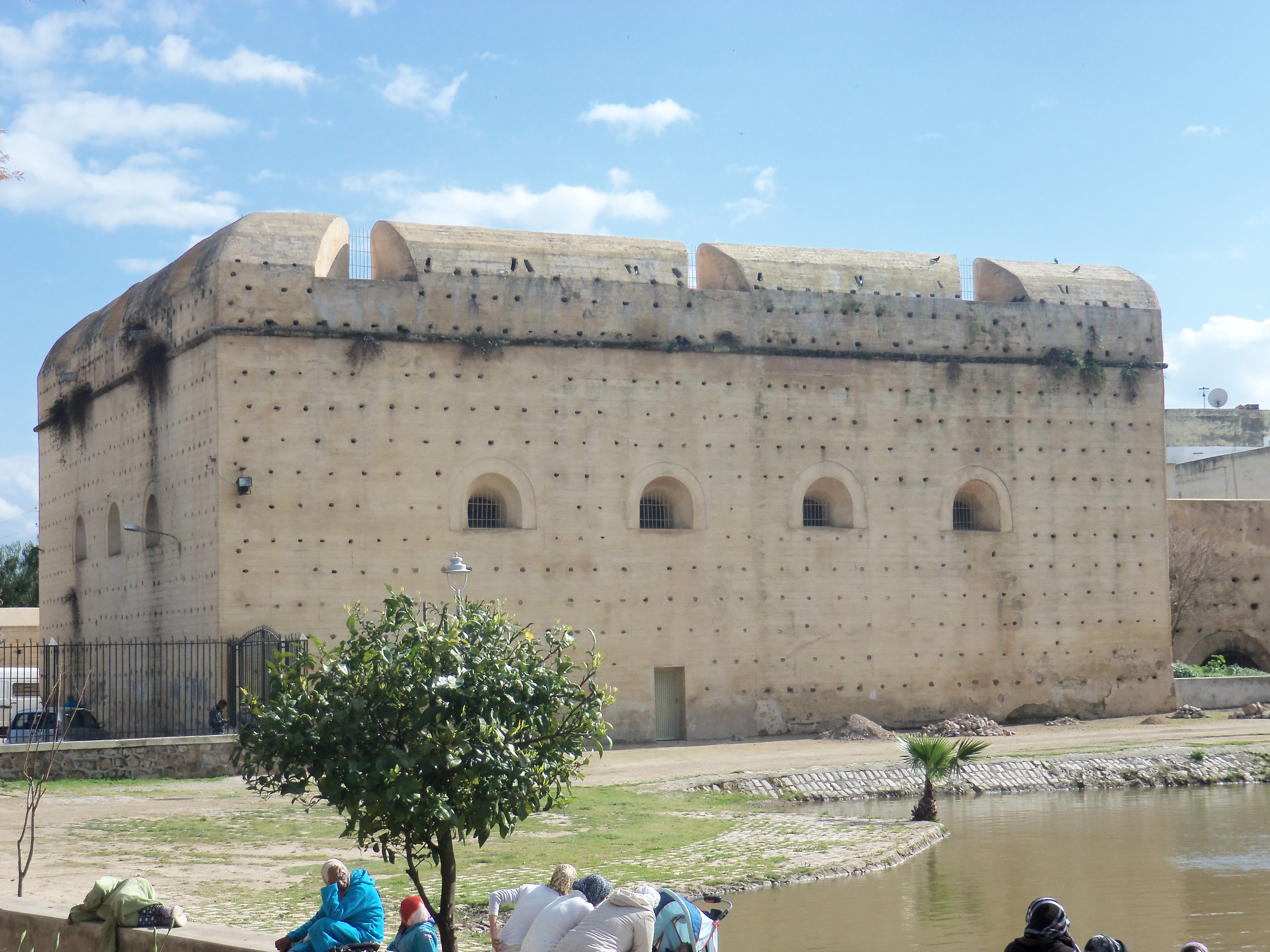
Borj Sheikh Ahmed, a Saadian-era bastion

The following are some of the major historic landmarks and monuments in or around Fes el-Jdid.

=== Mosques ===
- Grand Mosque of Fes el-Jdid
- al-Hamra Mosque
- Lalla ez-Zhar Mosque
- Moulay Abdallah Mosque
- al-Beida Mosque
- Lalla Ghriba Mosque

=== Jewish Mellah ===
- Ibn Danan Synagogue
- Al Fassiyine Synagogue
- The Jewish Cemetery

=== Royal Palace and related structures ===
- Dar al-Makhzen (Royal Palace grounds)
- Old Mechouar
- New Mechouar
- Dar al-Makina

=== Gates and fortifications ===
Fes el-Jdid is surrounded and divided in many areas by its old city walls and the walls of the Royal Palace, all dating now from various periods. Along these walls are also several bastions and monumental gates.

- Gates of the Royal Palace
- Bab al-Amer (gate)
- Bab Semmarine (gate)
- Bab Dekkakin (gate)
- Borj Sheikh Ahmed (16th-century Saadian bastion)
- Borj Twil (16th-century Saadian bastion)
- Borj Sidi Bou Nafa' (16th-century Saadian bastion)

=== Outlying sites ===
- Kasbah Cherarda (outside the walls of Fes el-Jdid but located nearby to the north)
- Jnan Sbil Gardens (located between the Old Mechouar and Place Bou Jeloud)
