= Dar al-Makina =

Historic building in Morocco

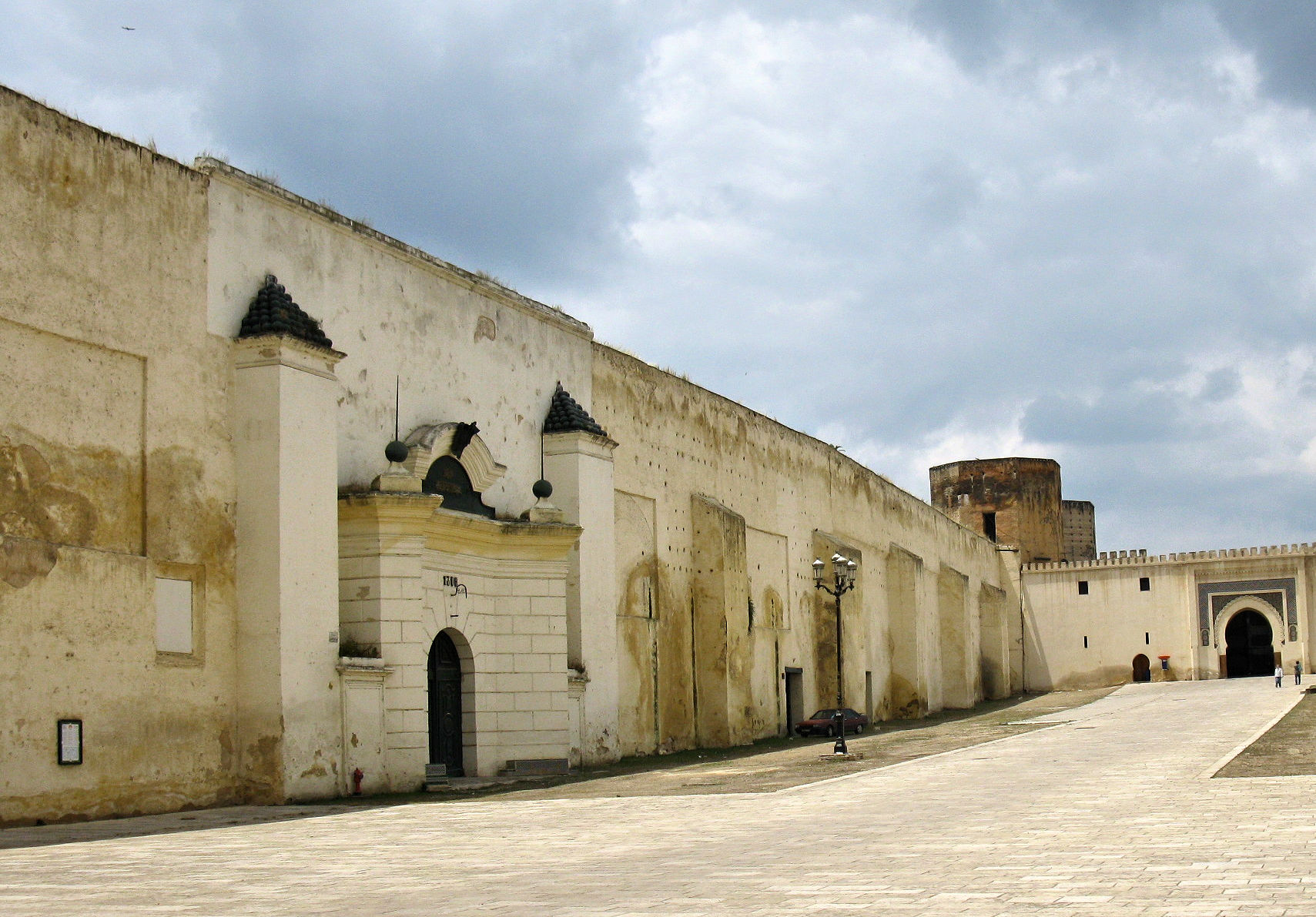
- The entrance to the Dar al-Makina (left), at the New Mechouar.
- Location: Fes, Morocco
- Coordinates: 34°03′32.3″N 4°59′31.4″W
- Builder: Hassan I
- Type: Armoury
- Completion date: 1886
- Owner: Morocco

The Dar al-Makina (Arabic: دار المكينة) is a former arms factory in Fes, Morocco.

== History ==
The Dar al-Makina (an Arabic adaptation of the word "machine") was established by Sultan Moulay Hassan in 1885–86 with the help of Italian officers. The northern gate of the New Mechouar, known as Bab Khibbat es-Smen ("Gate of the Butter Niche"), also dates from the 1886 construction of Moulay Hassan. The arms factory was an early attempt at industrialization in Fez and was part of the sultan's efforts to modernize the Moroccan army to compete with European powers, though they did not have enormous effect. The factory is no longer in use and stands abandoned and partially ruined. The structure is scheduled to be restored between 2018 and 2023 as part of a broader plan to restore over a hundred historic monuments in Fez.

== Description ==
The building occupies the western side of the New Mechouar square near the Dar al-Makhzen (Royal Palace) in Fes el-Jdid. It is entered by a gateway, Bab al-Makina, in an Italianate architectural style opening on the west side of the square. Inside, the Dar al-Makina consists of a vast series of vaulted chambers, similar to the architecture of the Heri as-Swani, the royal granaries of Moulay Ismail in Meknes.

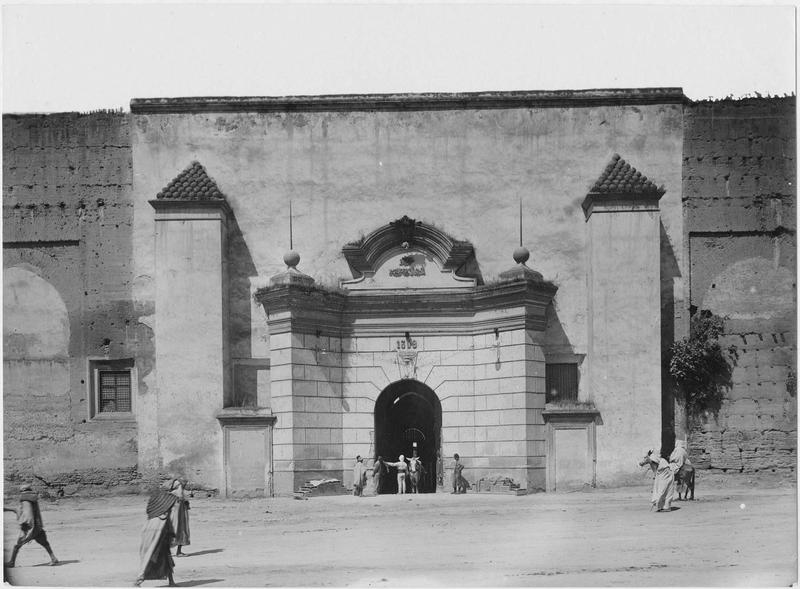
Bab al-Makina, the entrance of the Dar al-Makina, in 1913

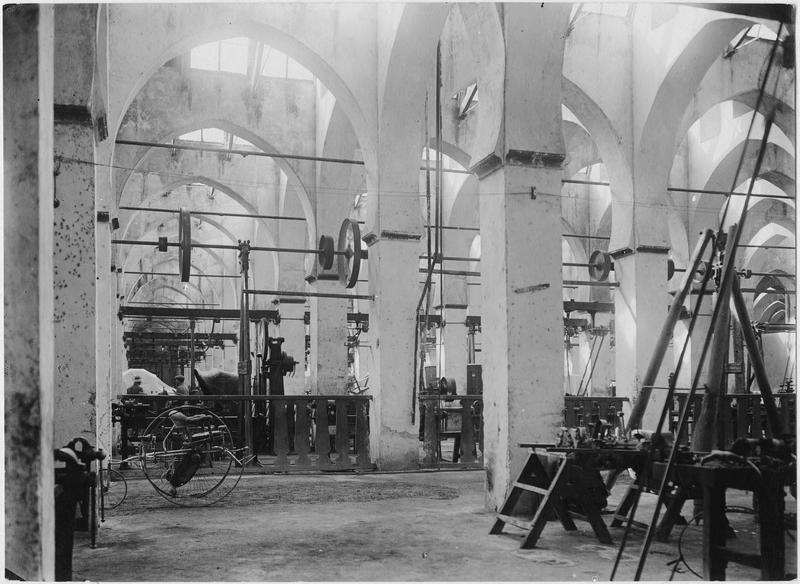
Inside the Dar al-Makina

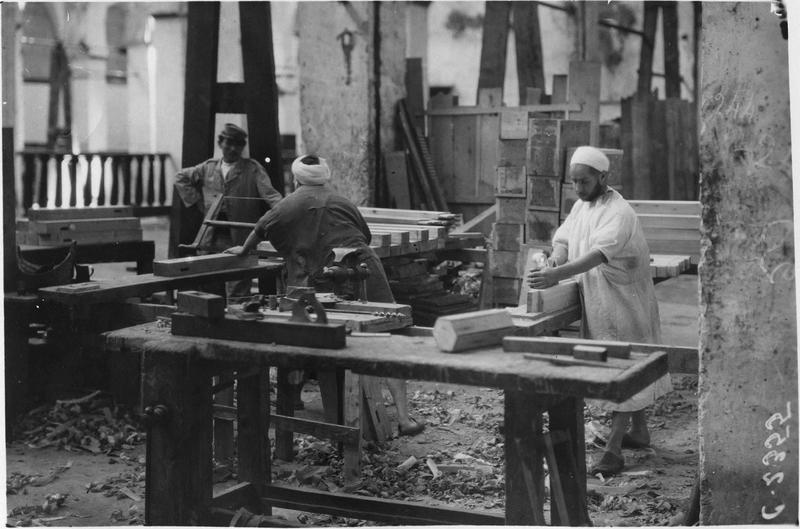
Workers in the Dar al-Makina in 1916

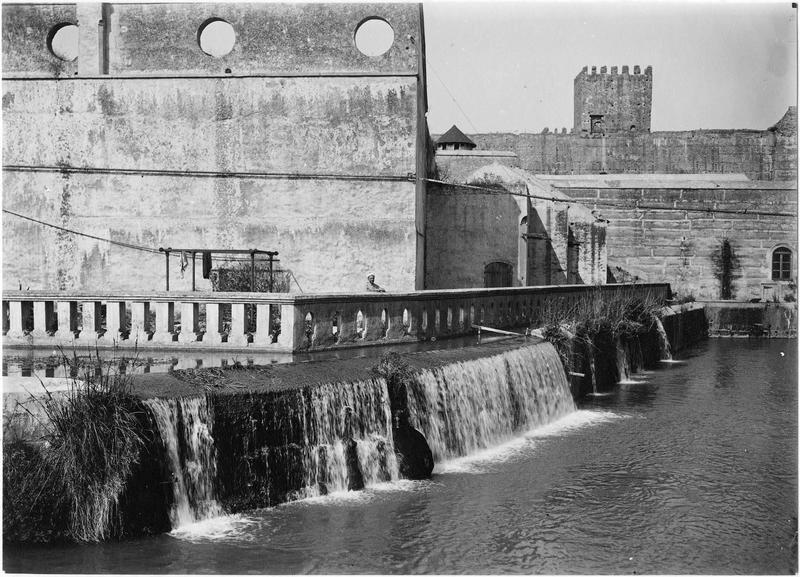
View of the Fez River and the waters which were diverted to power the factory
