= Jnan Sbil Gardens =

Public Garden

Coordinates: 34°03′32.4″N 04°59′16.7″W

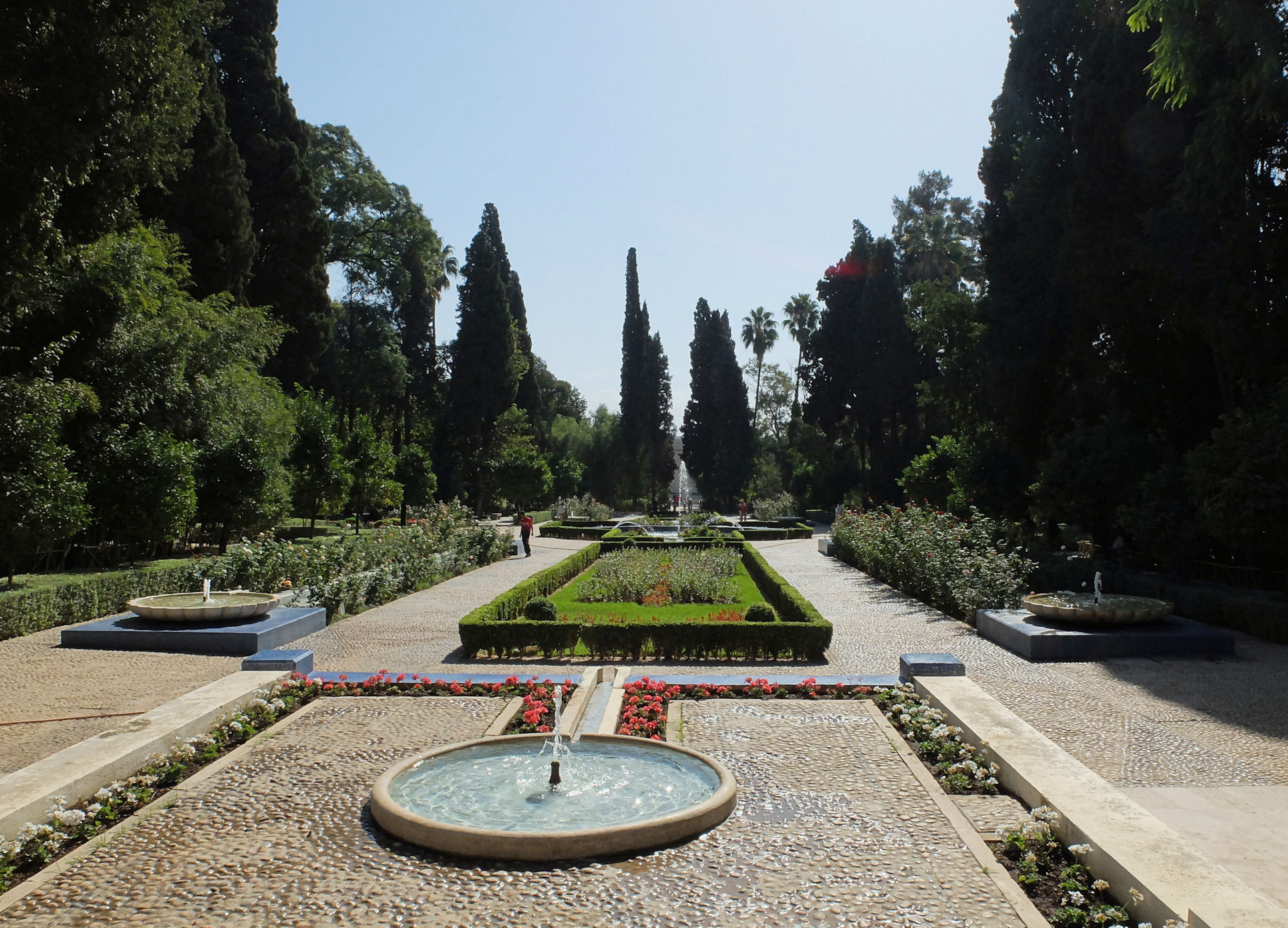
The main avenue of the gardens.

The Jnan Sbil Gardens (Arabic: جنان السبيل; also spelled Jnane Sbile from the French transliteration), also known as the Bou Jeloud Gardens, is public garden in Fez, Morocco, located between Fes el-Jdid and Fes el-Bali, the two sections of the old medina.

== History ==
The gardens were created in the 19th century by Sultan Moulay Hassan I (ruled 1873-1894), who was responsible for building the walls which connected Fes el-Jdid with Fes el-Bali for the first time. The gardens were placed inside the corridor between these walls, where the sultan also erected new summer palaces, such as the nearby Dar el-Beida.

The gardens were originally exclusive to royal elites and were connected to the Royal Palace by an underground passage, before being fully opened to the public in 1917. After a period of neglect, they were recently renovated between 2006 and 2010 on the initiative of King Mohammed VI and reopened in 2011.

== Description ==
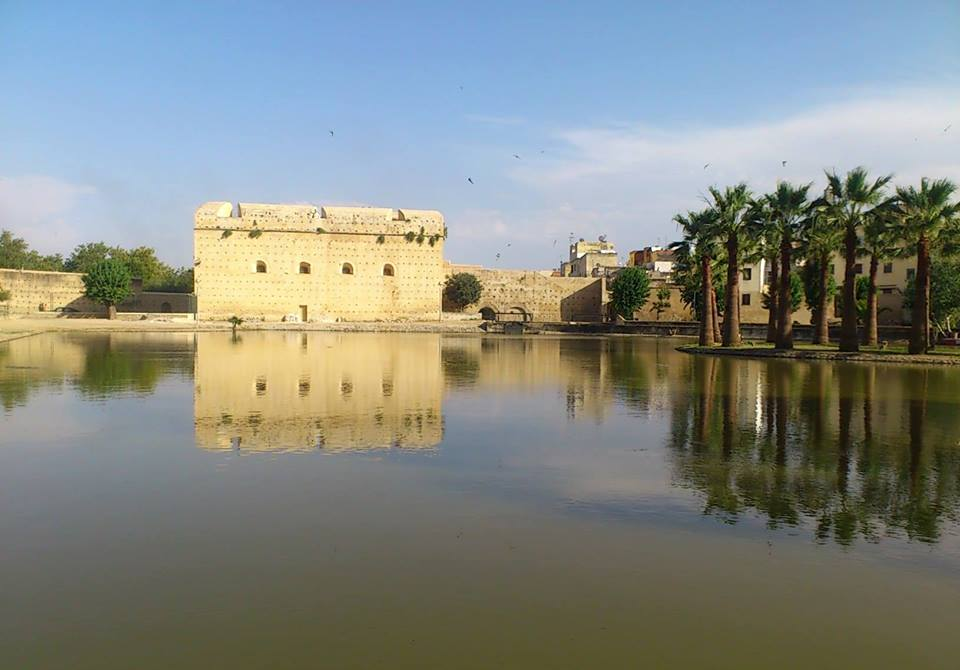
The lake on the south side of the gardens, with the 16th-century bastion of Borj Sheikh Ahmed in the background.

The gardens occupy approximately 7.5 hectares. Today they are one of the few rare urban green spaces in the old city and are a popular leisure spot, especially at dusk. They are decorated with colourful fountains and are planted with over 3000 species, including subsections labelled the "Andalusian Garden", the "Mexican Garden", and the "Bamboo Garden". The garden is regularly open during daylight hours but is normally closed on Mondays. It serves as one of the venues for the annual World Sacred Music Festival.

The gardens are located along the course of the local river (the Oued Fes or Oued el-Jawahir) and the historic water channels which provided water to the old city. Accordingly, some historic norias (water wheels) are also located in the area: one in the eastern part of the gardens and a larger one on the western edge of the gardens. The southern part of the gardens is occupied by a large pool. The far side of the pool is overlooked by the old ramparts of Fes el-Jdid and by a large 16th-century Saadian bastion known as Borj Sheikh Ahmed.
