= Lalla Ghriba Mosque, Tlemcen =

Mosque in Tlemcen, Algeria

Lalla Ghriba Mosque
- مسجد لالة غريبة
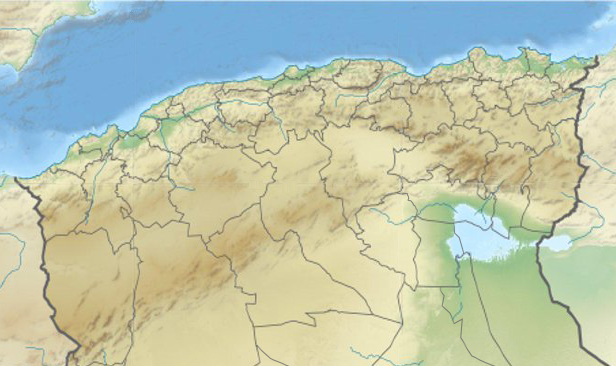
- Location of the mosque in northern Algeria

Religion
- Affiliation: Islam
- Status: Active

Location
- Location: Tlemcen
- Country: Algeria
- Interactive map of Lalla Ghriba Mosque
- Coordinates: 34°53′6.9″N 1°18′27.99″W

Architecture
- Type: Mosque
- Minaret: 1

The Lalla Ghriba Mosque (Arabic: مسجد لالة غريبة), also known as the Mosque of El-Korran, is a small mosque in the medina of Tlemcen, Algeria. It is located in Derb Es-Sbabet ('Alley of Shoes') in the El Korran neighborhood. The history of this building is not well known.

== History ==
=== Lalla Ghriba ===
In Maghrebi popular culture, Lalla Ghriba ('Strange Lady') is a legend and a myth about a woman who was a saint. Her devotions touched the Divine so much that she was gifted with miracles. It is said that she could perform wonders and was buried near this mosque in Tlemcen. According to tradition, she appears at night in the El Korran neighborhood, her white ghost moving between houses, prophesying misfortunes to come for their inhabitants. Another mosque in Fes, Morocco, and a synagogue in Djerba, Tunisia, also bear the name of this mythical figure.

=== Endowment ===
Charles Brosselard, a French researcher, mentioned the existence of a plaque written in Maghrebi script, composed of 32 lines, describing all the properties and endowments (waqf) such as houses, shops, and books allocated to the mosque to provide services or revenues. Brosselard estimated that the plaque was at least two centuries old. Its contents were fully published in 1876 in the Revue africaine. Abou El Kacem Saâdallah also noted the books preserved by a woman named Fatima Bent Djebour, including a copy of the work of Al-Suyuti and a copy of the work of Ibn al-Jawzi.

== Architecture ==
Georges Marçais and William Marçais explain that, initially, the structure served as a tomb before being repurposed into a mosque. It comprises a simple chamber with a single nave aligned parallel to the mihrab, featuring three arches - a semicircular central arch flanked by pointed arches.

The mihrab niche, shallow in depth, is bordered by a small semicircular arch. Positioned in a recess opposite the mihrab, the saint's tomb can be found on the wall. The minaret, fashioned as a tower with a four-pitched tiled roof, is placed next to the prayer hall, slightly rising above it. A solitary window in the tower enables the muezzin to issue the call to prayer for the faithful.

== See also ==
- Islam in Algeria
- List of mosques in Algeria
