= Lalla ez-Zhar Mosque =

Mosque in Fez, Morocco

- جامع لالة الزهر
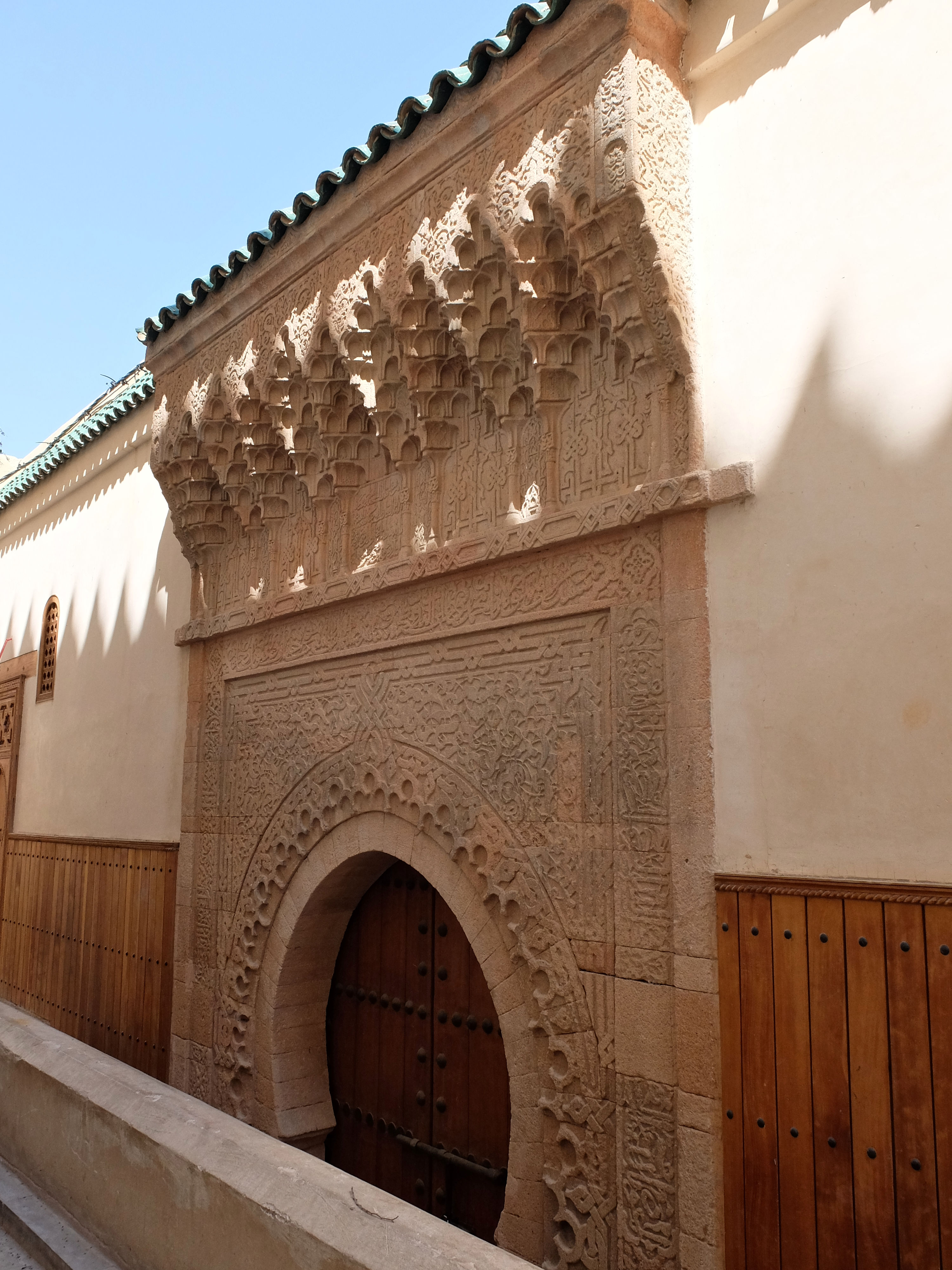
- Entrance of the mosque

Religion
- Affiliation: Sunni Islam

Location
- Location: Fez, Morocco
- Interactive map of Lalla ez-Zhar Mosque
- Coordinates: 34°03′18.7″N 4°59′29.1″W

Architecture
- Type: mosque
- Style: Moorish (Marinid)
- Founder: Abu Inan
- Completed: 1357 CE

Specifications
- Minaret: 1
- Minaret height: (approx.) 21.1 m
- Materials: brick, wood, stone

The Lalla ez-Zhar Mosque (Arabic: جامع لالة الزهر, romanized: Jama’ Lalla ez-Zhar, lit. 'Mosque of the Lady of the (Orange Tree's) Flower'), or al-Zahr Mosque, is a mosque located in Fes el-Jdid in the historic old city of Fez, Morocco. It is also known by the name Jama’ el-Hajjar (“Mosque of Stone”), probably in reference to its stone portal entrance. The mosque was founded or completed in 1357 CE (759 AH) by the Marinid sultan Abu Inan.

== Architecture ==
=== Layout ===
The mosque consists essentially of a square floor plan to which are adjoined the minaret (at the southeast corner) and an ablutions chamber next to it. The interior is divided into three aisles or naves by two rows of three horseshoe arches. The middle of the northernmost aisle is occupied by a small square open courtyard (sahn), measuring 6.6 metres (22 ft) per side and featuring a central fountain. A well 12 metres (39 ft) deep is also included along the northern wall of the mosque to the east of the courtyard, which provided water. The main entrance of the mosque leads into this courtyard. The southernmost aisle includes the mihrab (niche symbolizing the direction of prayer), located in the middle of the mosque's back wall. The ablutions chamber, adjoined to the east side of the mosque, is reached by a passage which branches off from the vestibule of the main entrance. The chamber consists of a courtyard with rectangular water basin and flanked by smaller rooms for latrines.

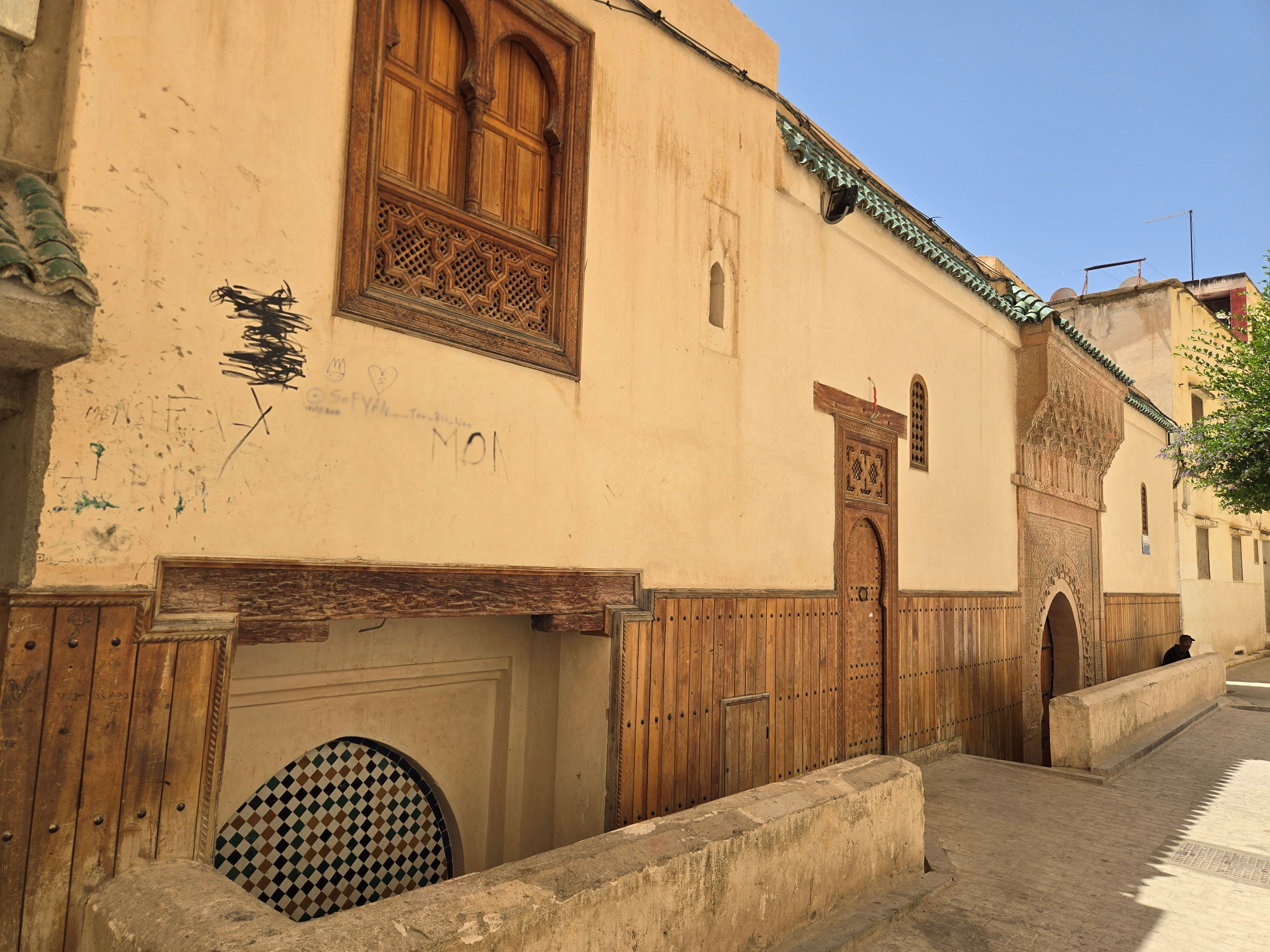
Northwest side of the mosque, facing the street

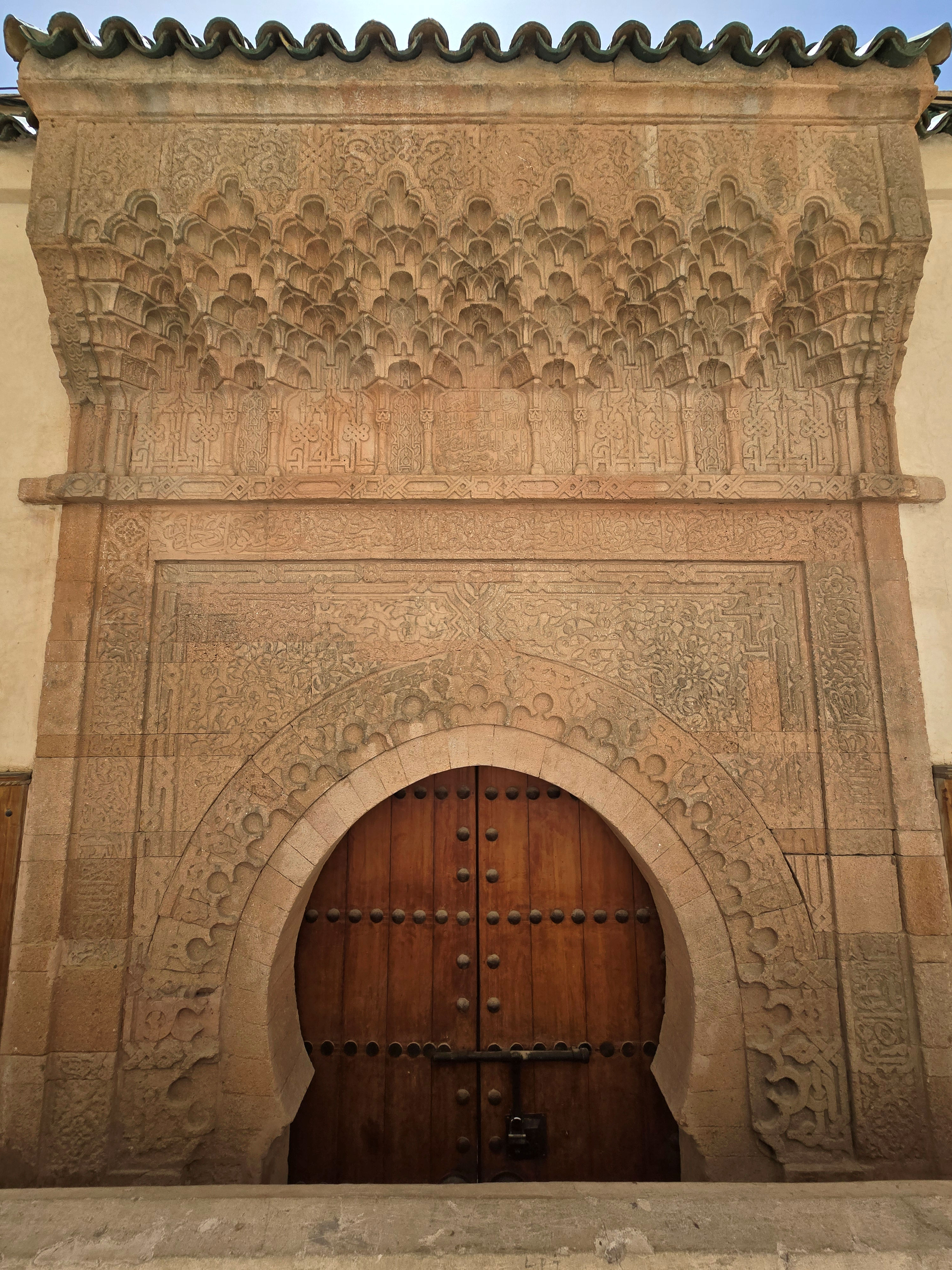
The main gate of the mosque

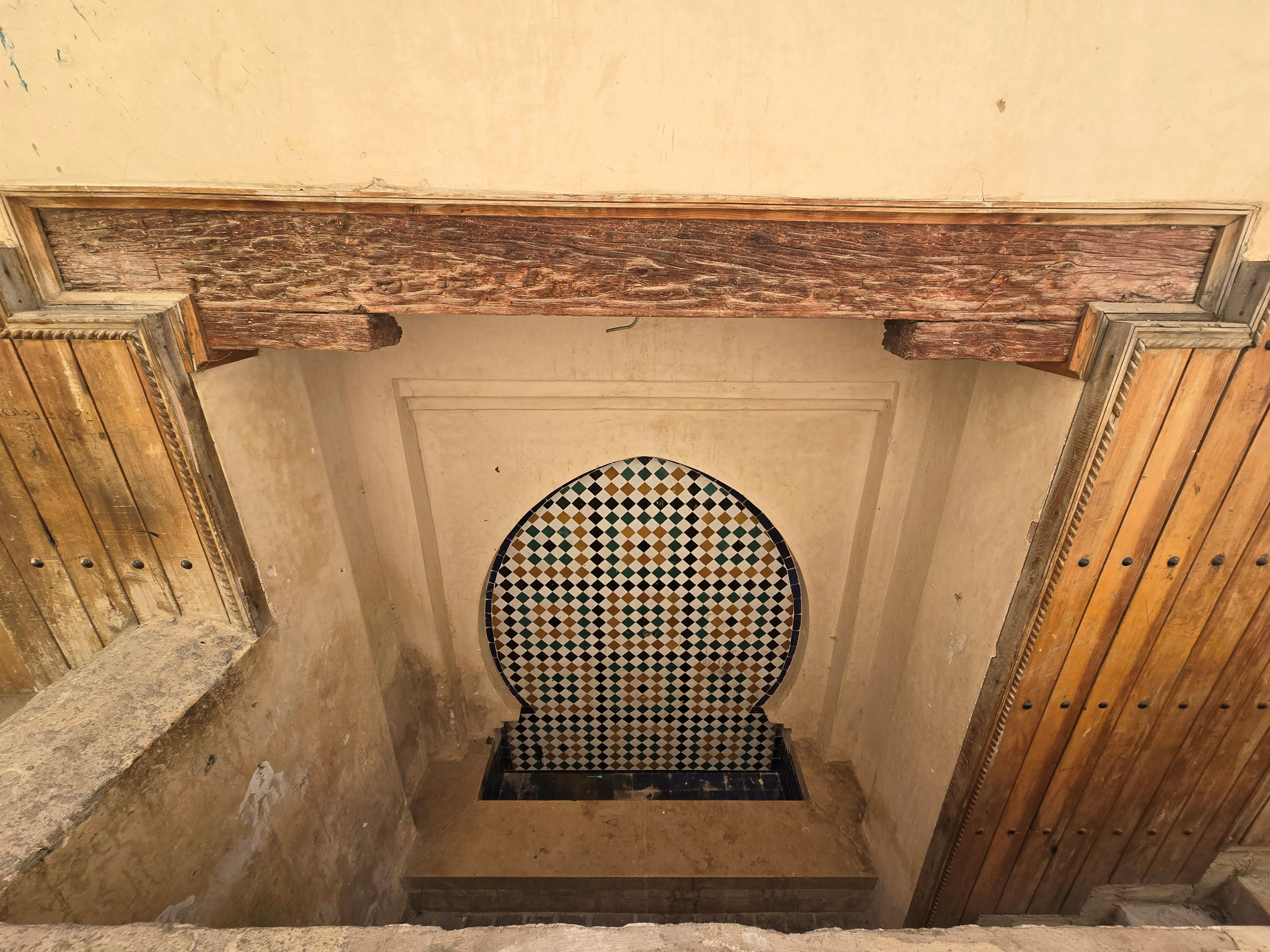
Street fountain at the northern corner

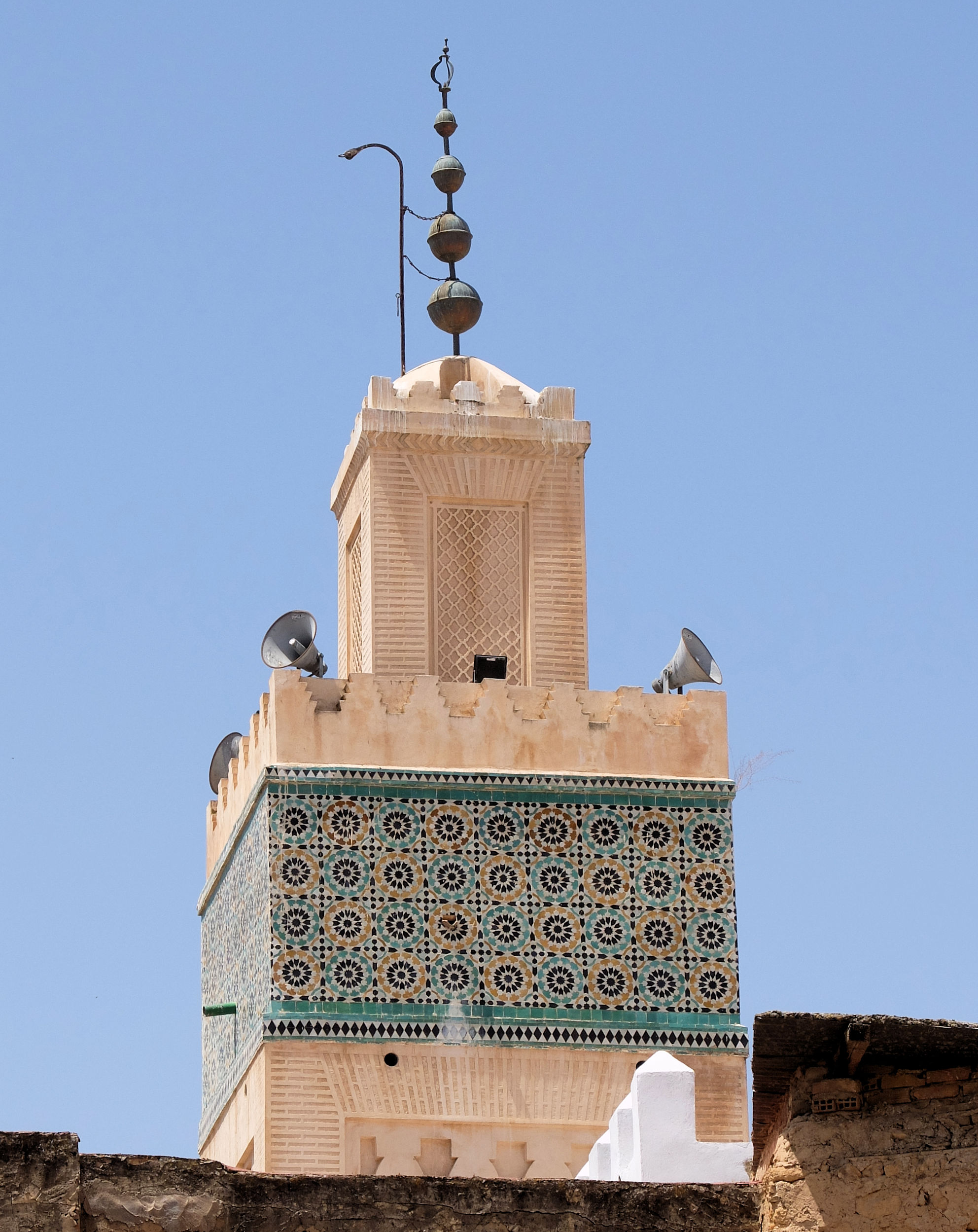
Partial view of the minaret, seen from a nearby street

=== Decoration ===
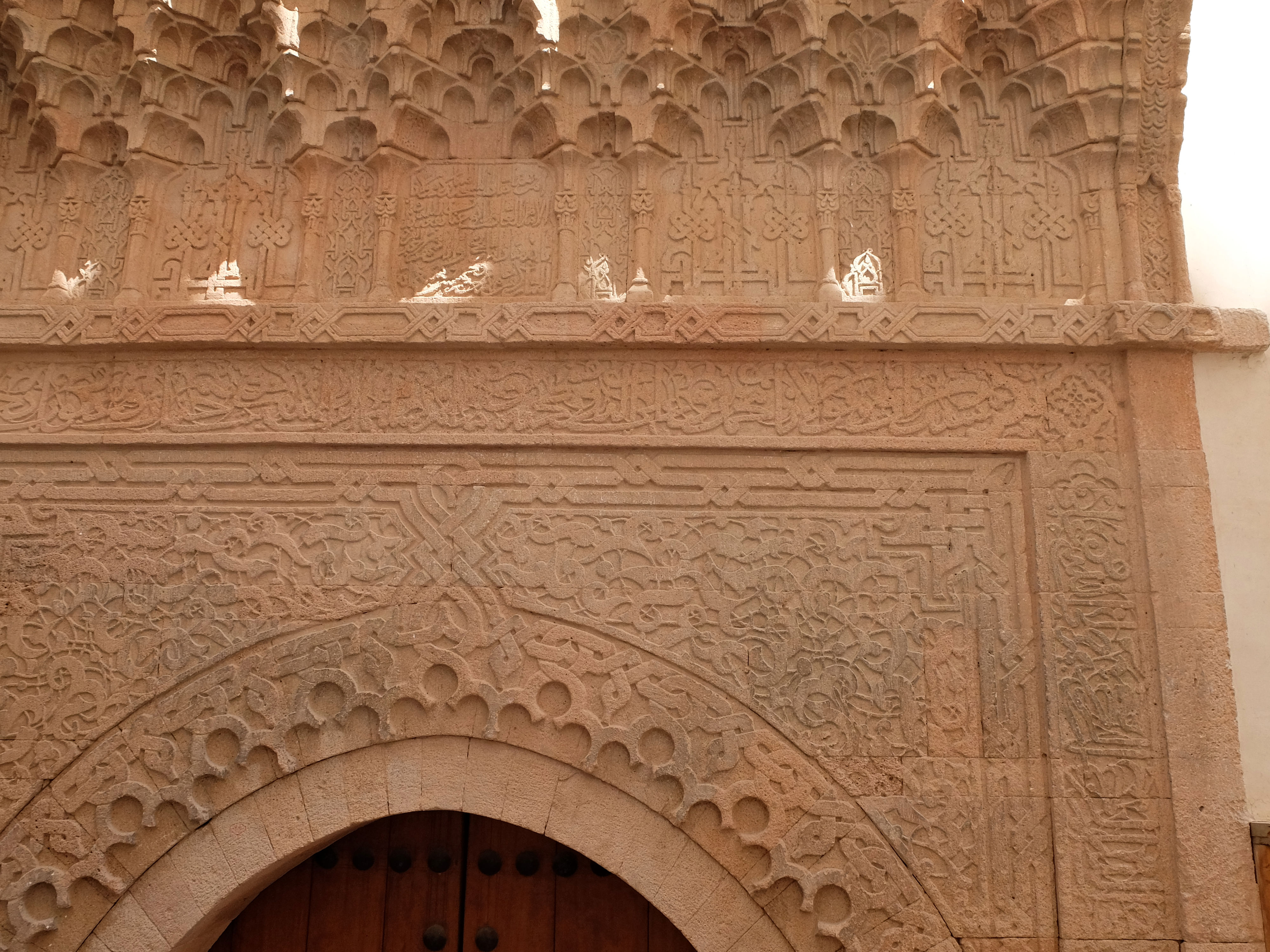
Detail of the mosque's stone portal

The mosque is noted for its exquisite decoration in spite of its size. Most notably, its entrance portal is made of carved stone (relatively rare for Marinid mosques) featuring geometric patterns and muqarnas. A legend claims that the stone portal was carved in al-Andalus (Muslim Spain) under commission from Abu Inan and then transported to Fez. An Arabic inscription carved in the stone over the entrance praises Abu Inan and records the date of the mosque's foundation.

The mosque has an ornate minaret whose facades are covered with alternating darj-wa-ktaf motifs (similar to the Grand Mosque of Fes el-Jdid) and whose main shaft is crowned by a wide bad of zellij or mosaic tilework in geometric patterns. The most notable interior decoration is around the mihrab, which has richly-carved stucco decoration.

== See also ==
- Lists of mosques
- List of mosques in Africa
- List of mosques in Morocco
