= Bab Semmarine =

- باب السمارين
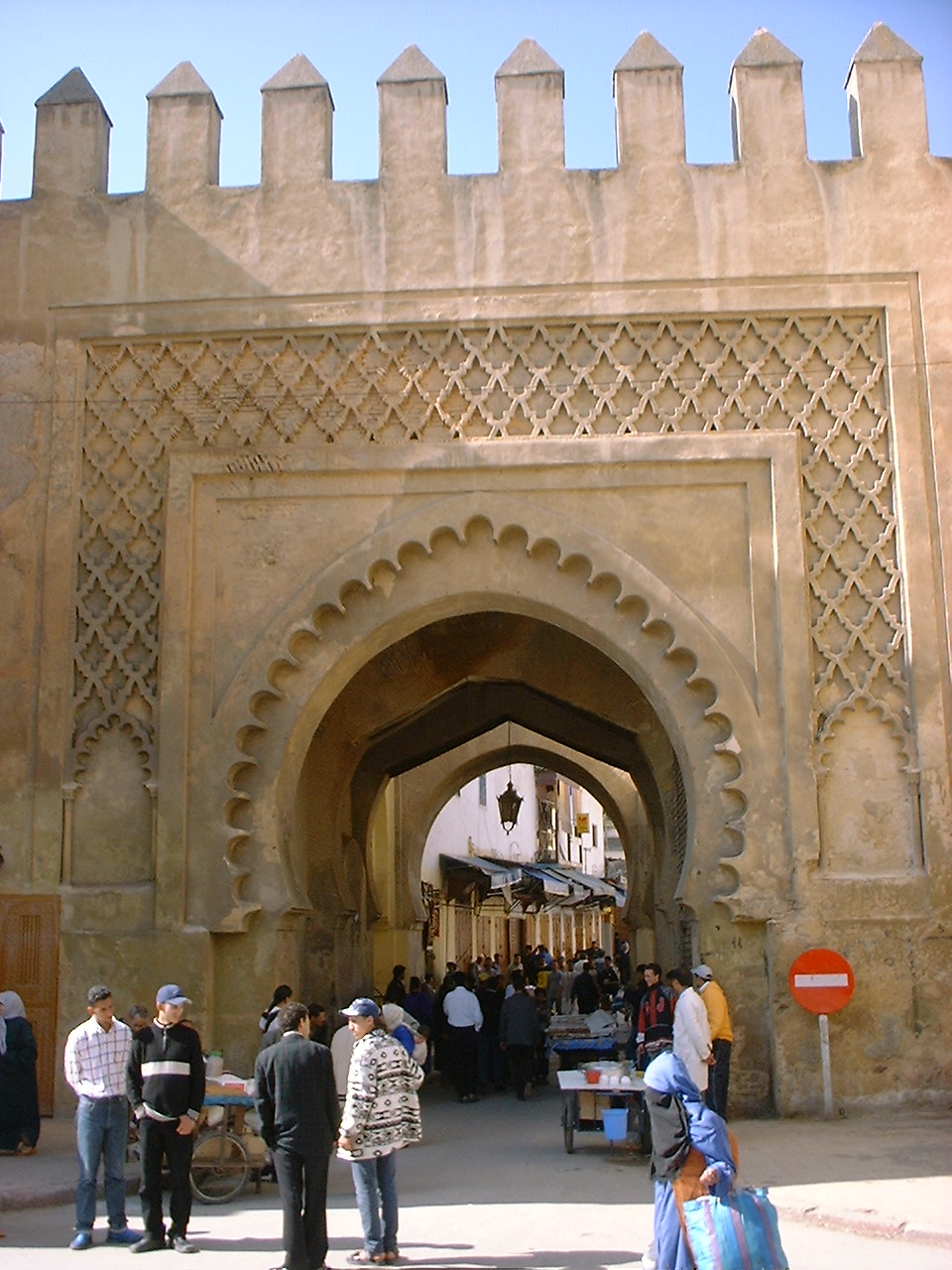
- The outer (southern) facade of Bab Semmarine.
- Interactive map of the Bab Semmarine area
- Former names: Bab 'Oyun Sanhaja

General information
- Type: city gate
- Architectural style: Marinid, Moorish, Moroccan
- Location: Fez, Morocco
- Coordinates: 34°03′15.15″N 4°59′24.2″W
- Completed: circa 1276 CE (foundation)
- Renovated: 1924 (major reconstruction/modification)

Bab Semmarine (Arabic: باب السمارين, lit. 'Gate of the Farriers') is the monumental southern gate of Fes el-Jdid, a part of the old city of Fez, Morocco.

== History ==
The original gate at this location was initially called Bab 'Oyun Sanhaja ("Gate of the (water) Sources of the Sanhaja"). The current name, Bab Semmarine, means "Gate of the Farriers" and refers to the shops of farriers which used to be located nearby. The gate was part of the original foundation of Fes el-Jdid by the Marinid sultan Abu Yusuf Ya'qub in 1276, who built the city as a new royal capital separate from Fes el-Bali. The city was highly fortified, featuring a double set of walls on its eastern side facing the old city, which may have indicated a certain level of wariness by the Marinid sultans towards the local population. Bab Semmarine was originally the southern entrance to the city, but at some later point another district (later occupied by the Jewish Mellah) was created on its southern side, thus placing it inside the perimeter of the city walls. The gate was the starting point for the main souq street, today called the Grande Rue ("Great Street"), leading towards the entrance of the Dar al-Makhzen (Royal Palace) in the north. The district to the east of this street, near the gate, used to be occupied entirely by grain silos and warehouses, which were only later progressively replaced by residential structures.

The gate was heavily modified or entirely rebuilt in 1924, during the French colonial administration, when it was adapted for greater traffic flow.

== Architecture ==
Originally, the gate had a bent entrance: its interior passage turned 90 degrees multiple times. This was a common defensive feature in medieval Moroccan gates and medieval military architecture elsewhere. However, as part of modifications in the early 20th century the interior walls of this passage were opened up to allow more traffic, including vehicle traffic, to pass through more easily. As a result, today the gate now has a double entrance with multiple archways across the space of the former passage. The original entrance of the gate, flanked by defensive towers on either side, is on the left when facing it from the south (from the outer side). The gate's outer facade is decorated with blind polylobed arches and with a rectangular outline with the darj-wa-ktaf motif (a Moroccan motif vaguely resembling the fleur-de-lys or palmette).

Inside the gate's passage there is also a side door which opens to another passage which runs westwards along the old walls and which historically gave direct access to the royal palace. On the other side, also reached from inside, is a large vaulted market hall which was also rebuilt in the 20th century in the style of the Marinid granaries which formerly stood here.

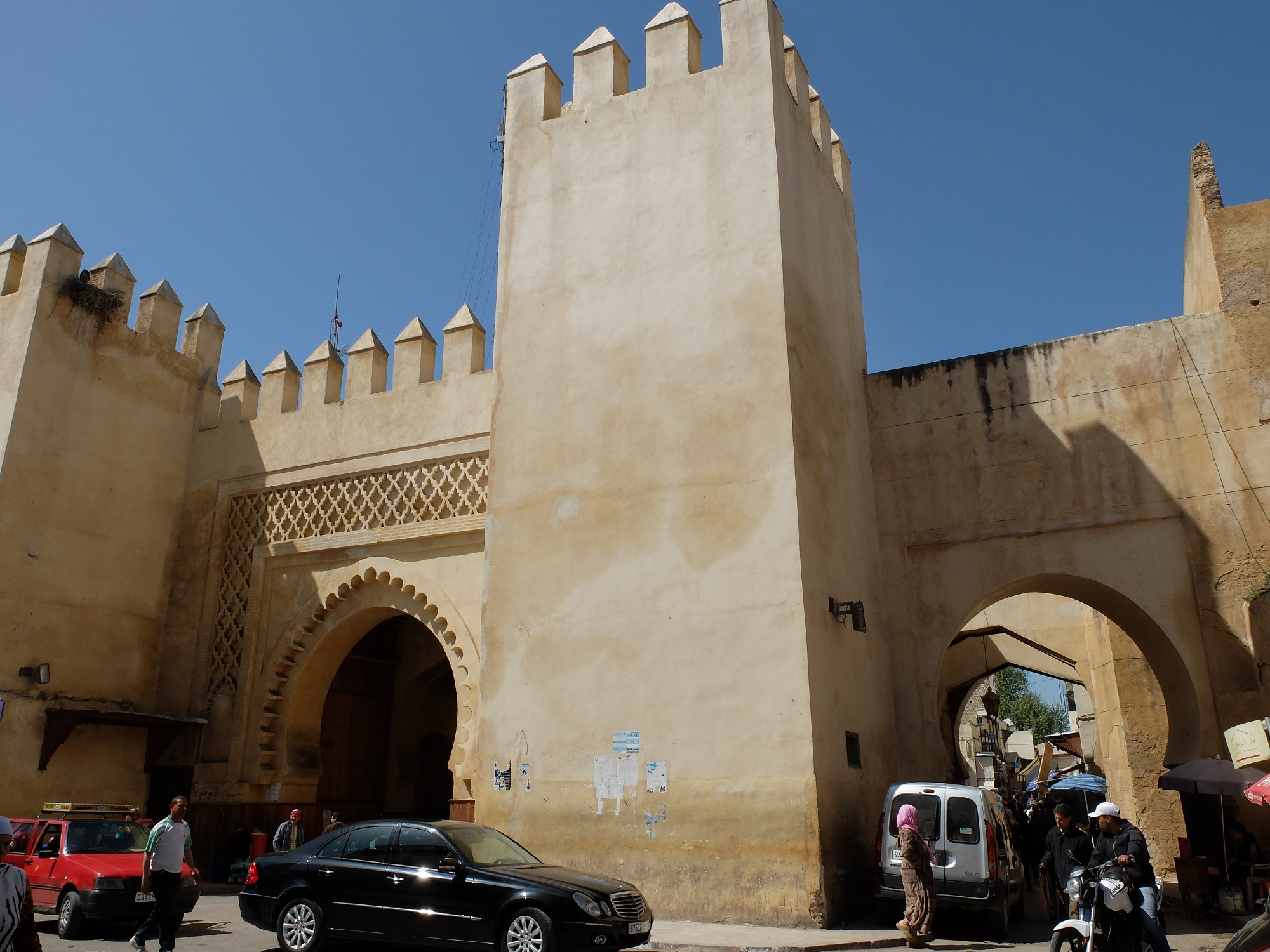
The outer facade of the gate, today with a double entrance.

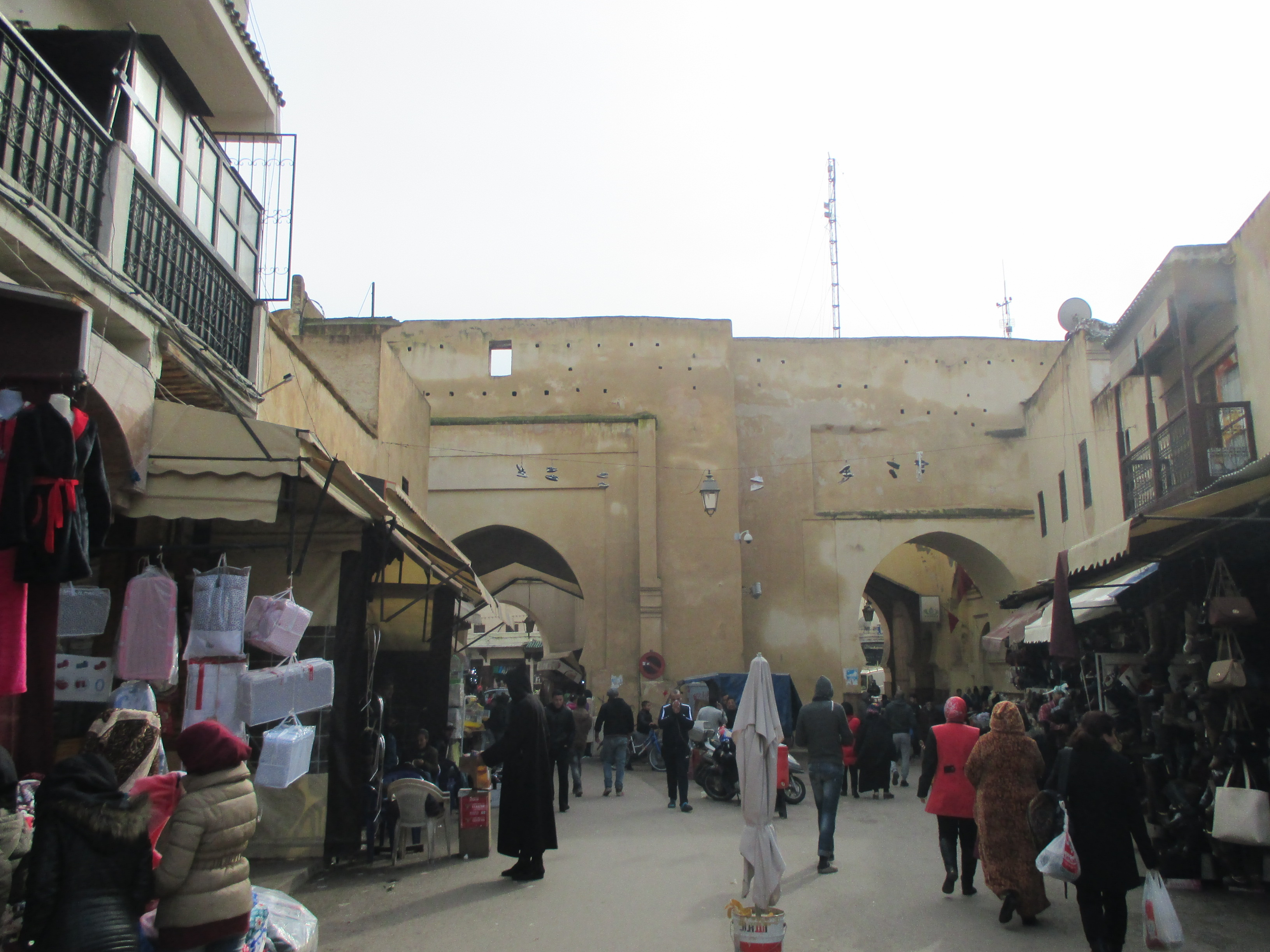
The inner facade of the gate.

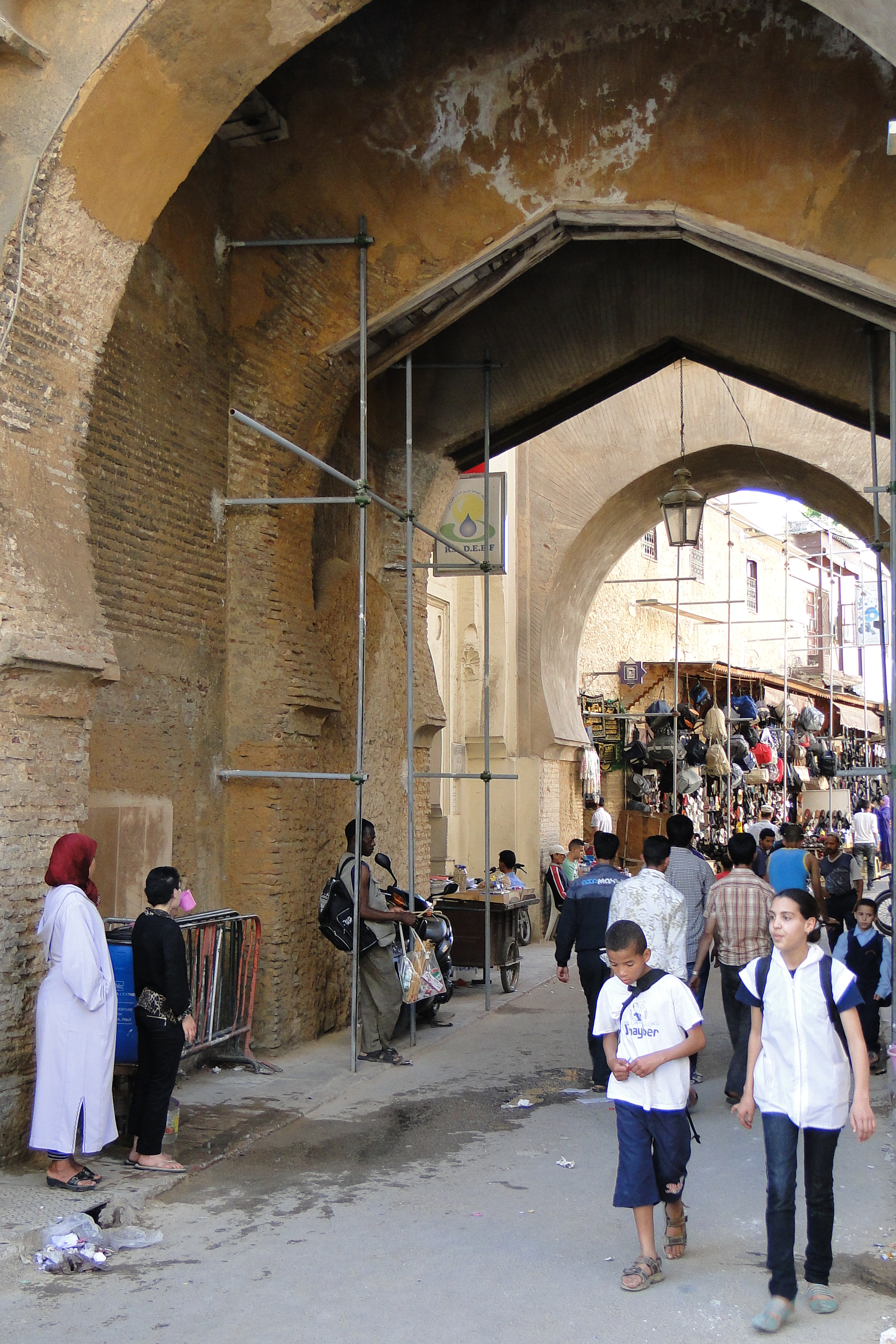
The interior of the gate, which is now a direct passage but which was once a bent entrance.

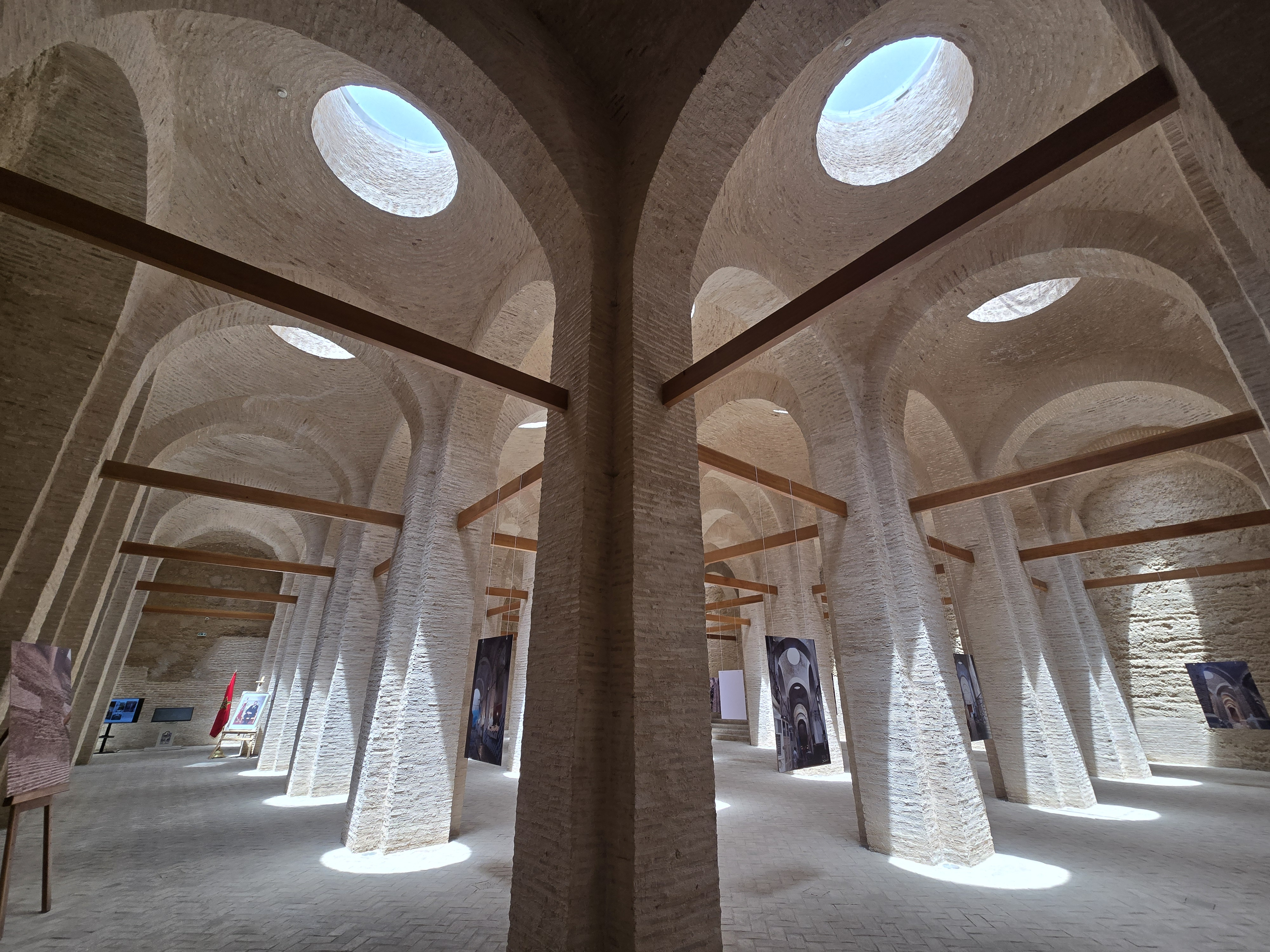
The market hall and former granary, attached to the west side of the gate
