= Lalla Ghriba Mosque, Fez =

Mosque in Fez, Morocco

Lalla Ghriba Mosque
- مسجد لالة غريبة
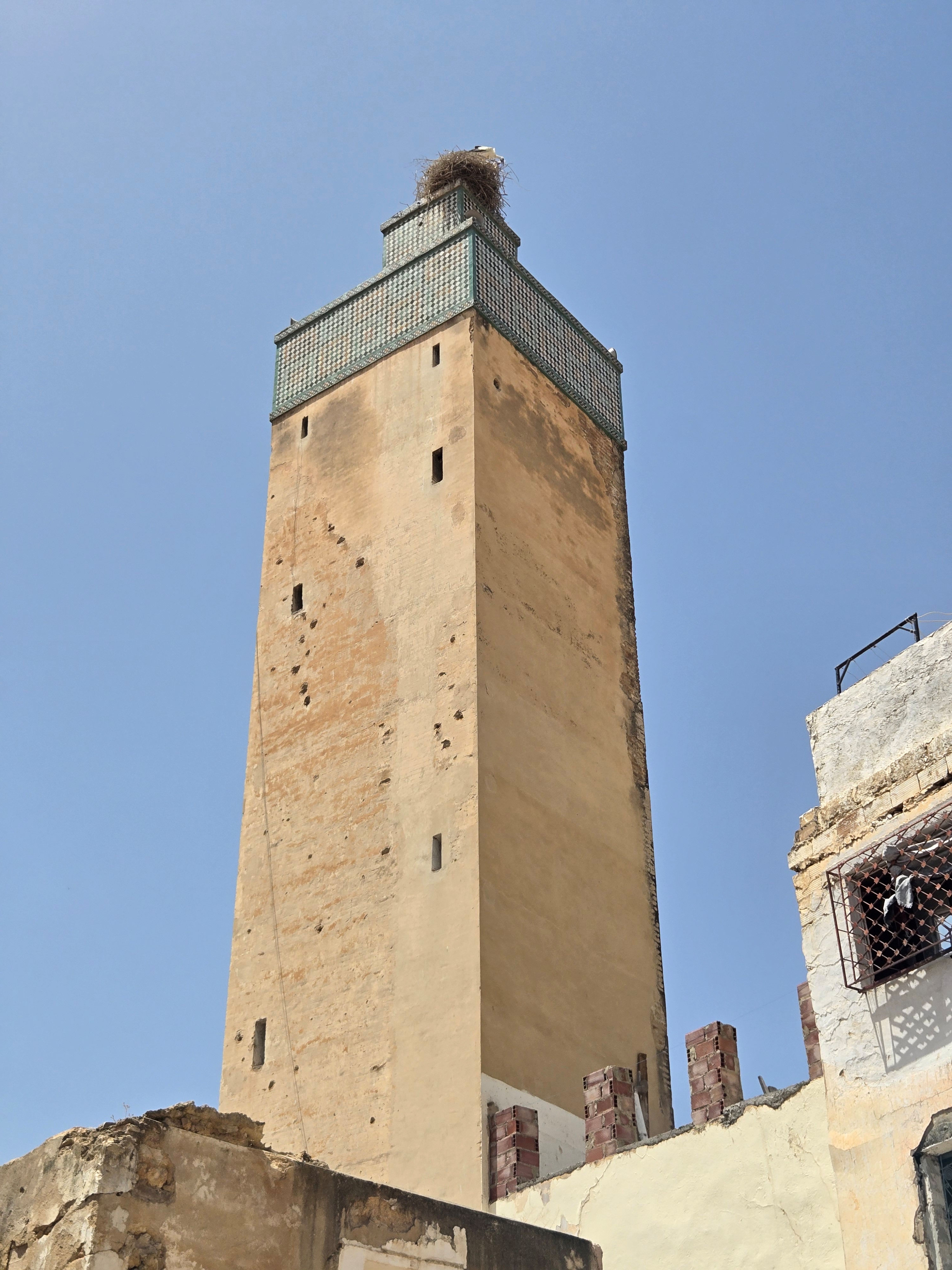
- Minaret of the mosque

Religion
- Affiliation: Sunni Islam

Location
- Location: Fez, Morocco
- Interactive map of Lalla Ghriba Mosque
- Coordinates: 34°03′23.4″N 4°58′15.8″W

Architecture
- Type: Mosque
- Established: 1408

The Lalla Ghriba Mosque is one of the main neighbourhood mosques of Fes el-Jdid, a part of the historic medina of Fez, Morocco.

== Historical background ==
The mosque was founded in 1408, under the reign of the Marinid sultan Abu Sa'id Uthman III. The surrounding Lalla Ghriba neighbourhood is named after the mosque and occupies the far east and northeast of Fes el-Jdid. This area had previously been occupied by grain silos and open spaces where passing troops could camp. The mosque's relatively late foundation (compared to other Marinid mosques in the city, which were mostly founded before the 15th century), likely reflects the fact that this area, far from the city's main street, took longer to develop into a residential area. After the neighbourhood's development, only the southeast part of the city, near Bab Semmarine, was left as yet unsettled.

The mosque's minaret is slimmer and more tapered than those of other contemporary mosques. It was used as a reference point for the orientation of the main avenue (Avenue Hassan II today) of the Ville Nouvelle (New City) of Fes when it was being built under the French colonial governor Lyautey in 1916.

== See also ==
- List of mosques in Morocco
