= 1033 Fez massacre =

Massacre of Jews by the Banu Ifran tribe

- The location of Fez, Morocco
- Location: Fez, Morocco
- Date: 1033 AD
- Target: Moroccan Jews
- Deaths: 6,000+ Jews
- Perpetrator: Muslim Zenata Berber tribe of Banu Ifran

The 1033 Fez massacre was an event where, following their conquest of the city from the Maghrawa tribe, the forces of Abu'l Kamal Tamim, chief of the Banu Ifran tribe, perpetrated a massacre of Jews in Fes. David Corcos wrote that the Bani Ifran from near Salé attacked Fes, where they raped, pillaged, and killed 6,000 Jews.

In a period of war and tension between Sunni rule in Morocco and Kharijite rule to the east, the city of Fes in Morocco had been contested between the Zenata Berber tribes of Miknasa, Maghrawa and Banu Ifran for the previous half century, in the aftermath of the fall of the Idrisid dynasty. In 1033, according to Ibn Khaldun (d. 1406), Abu'l Kamal Tamim, the Banu Ifran chief, was lord of Salé on the Atlantic coast, while Fez was under the control of Hammama, chief of the Maghrawa.

Tamim's forces killed over six thousand Jews, appropriated their belongings, and captured the Jewish women of the city. The killings took place in the month of Jumaada al-Akhir 424 AH (May–June 1033 AD). The killings have been called a pogrom by some modern writers.

After fleeing east to Oujda and rallying the Maghrawa forces, Hammama recaptured Fez in 1037–1038, forcing Tamim to flee to Salé.

== See also ==
- Timeline of Jewish History
- Timeline of antisemitism
- Moroccan Jews
