= Abu Qurra =

8th-century Berber Muslim monarch

- Caliph, Imam, Amir al-Mu'minin
- Map showing all of the lands ruled by Abu Qurra

Emir of Tlemcen
- Reign: 765–790
- Predecessor: Khalid (as rebel leader)
- Successor: Position abolished
- Born: Unknown
- Died: After 790
- Berber: ⴰⴱⵓ ⵇⵓⵔⴰ
- Dynasty: Ifranids
- Religion: Sunni Islam

Abu Qurra (Arabic: أبو قرة) a member of the Sufrite tribe Banu Ifran of Tlemcen, was the founder of the indigenous Berber Muslim movement with Kharijite tendencies in North Africa after the overthrow of the Umayyad dynasty.

Between 767 and 776, Abu Qurra organised an army of more than 350,000 riders in the north of Africa. He was the first head of state of the Berber Muslim Maghreb. Ibn Khaldun described him in his book Kitab El Ibar. Abu Qurra is known as the founder of Tlemcen during his reign on the Sufri kingdom (776–778).

== Biography ==
=== Reign ===
In 765, following the death of Khaled ibn Hamid, Abu Qurra was proclaimed caliph as both spiritual and temporal ruler by members of his tribe, which had seized power throughout the Central Maghreb.

Between 767 and 776 Abu Qurra began to lead expeditions against the Abbasids and became their most important enemies while leading an army that, according to Ibn Khaldun, numbered over 350,000 horsemen. Abu Qurra hunted down the Abbasid governor after reaching Tobna, Omar ibn Hafç-Hazarmard, who had hidden in Kairouan which Abu Qurra then besieged and subdued after defeating the Abbasid army. Back in Tlemcen, he allied himself with the Maghrawa and had to confront the expansionist aims of the Idrisids.

The Abbasids sent a strong army under the new governor, Yazid ibn Hatim al-Muhallabi, who defeated the Kharijites in Ifriqiya, but the rest of the Maghreb escaped his authority.

He first captured Tobna at the head of a force of 40,000 comprising both cavalry and infantry along with 6,000 Ibadi followers led by Ibn Rustam and troops from the Sanhaja confederation; he subsequently laid siege to the city of Kairouan in present-day Tunisia. At that time, all the Berber tribes were placed under his command. Ibn Rustam, who was married to a woman from the Banu Ifren and was the only Persian in this army, was also proclaimed Imam by the Banu Ifran and their neighbors, the Maghila.

Around 778, he replaced Abu Qurra and founded the Rustamid kingdom of Tahert. He seized the assets held by the Abbasids and had Ibn Hafs al-Azdi killed during the siege of the city. Following this victory, Abu Qurra and the Banu Ifran withdrew to return to their own kingdom of Tlemcen. After this triumph, Abu Qurra abandoned both Kharijism and his position of power, due to internal divisions among the Berbers.

=== Foundation of Agadir ===
Agadir (present-day Tlemcen) was founded by Abu Qurra in 790 and became the capital of the Berbers Sufrites. The city was built on the ruins of the Roman city of Pomaria.

== Legacy ==
The kingdom did not last long: in accordance with the strict rules of Sufrites, Abu Qurra would not allow his descendants to found a dynasty.

He welcomed Idris I and recognized his kingdom while also breaking up with the Rustamids. In turn, Idris I negotiated the surrender of Tlemcen with the Maghrawa. One of his descendants, Muhammed Sulayman, established the Sulaymanid kingdom in the region, a state that dominated the cities and lasted until the time of the Fatimids in 931. Tlemcen became a distinguished city, growing in connection with the Sunni Arab culture of Al-Andalus; in the countryside however, the Ifranids retained their heterodox faith. In 955 their leader Yala Ibn Mohamed revolted against the Fatimids.
