= Oued Fes =

River in Morocco

Coordinates: 34°04′39″N 4°55′30″W

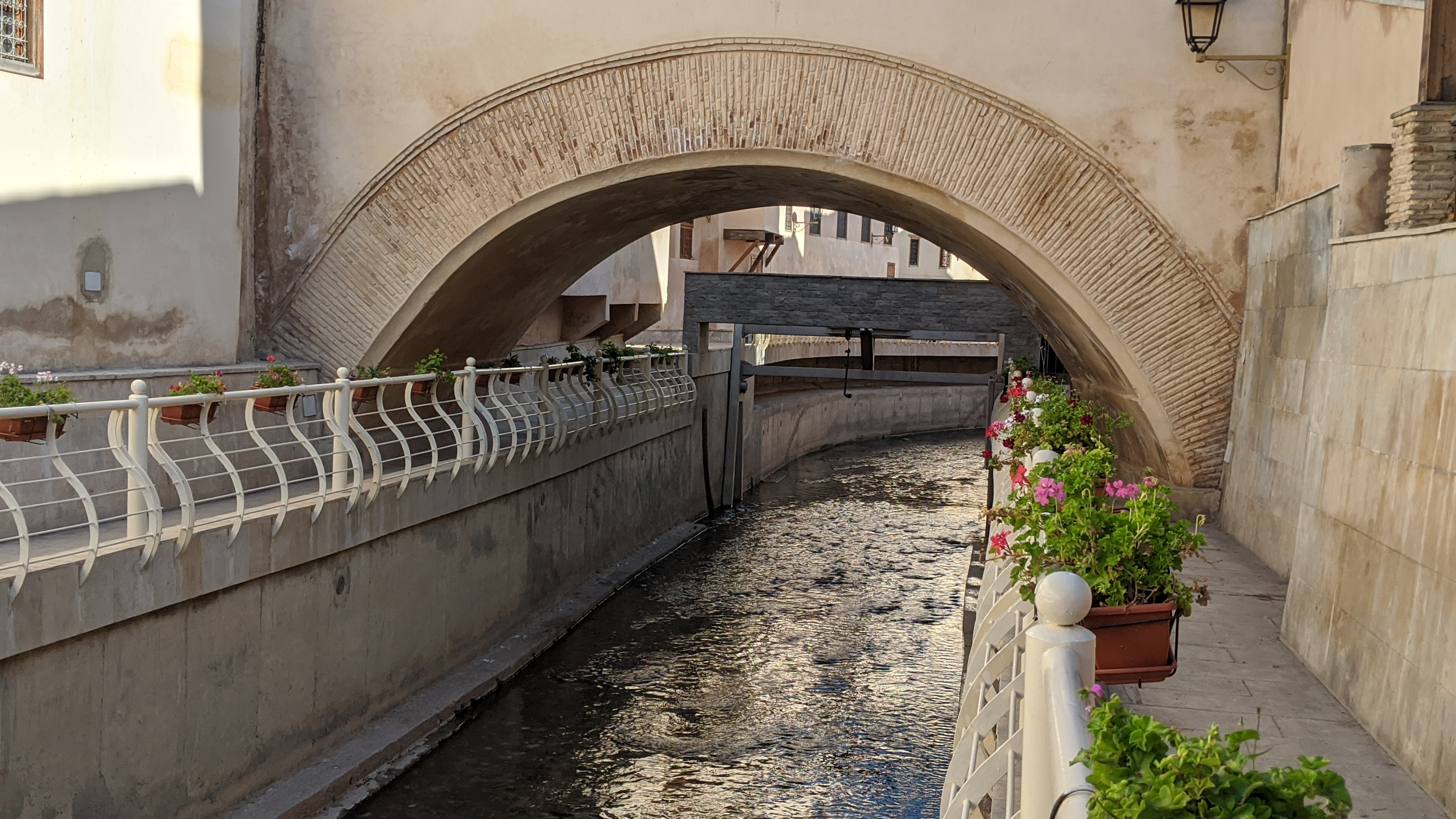
The Oued Bou Khrareb (a part of the Oued Fes) flowing through the middle of Fes el-Bali, seen in 2020

The Oued Fes (Arabic: واد فاس, lit. 'River of Fes') or Fez River is a river in Morocco. It is a tributary of the Sebou River and historically the main source of water for Morocco's second largest city, Fes, after which it is named.

The river consists of a number of different streams which originate in the Saïss Plain to the south and west of Fes before joining together in the area of Fes el-Bali, the old city (medina) of Fes. Over the centuries the river has been split and diverted into a multitude of canals that distributed water across the city and once powered a number of historic waterwheels. These various water channels converge into the Oued Bou Khrareb which runs through the middle of the old city and historically divided the Qarawiyyin and Andalusiyyin quarters. After the river leaves the city it runs eastwards for a short distance before joining the Sebou River. The various branches and sections of the river, including many of the man-made canals, also have their own names.

== Description of the river ==
=== Source ===
The river begins at Ras al-Ma ("Head of the Water"), 12 kilometres southwest of the city, from a hollow of lacustrine limestone, with an approximate flow of 500 litres/second.

=== Oued al-Jawahir ===
The main branch of the river skirts the northern edge of the Royal Palace grounds (the Dar al-Makhzen) and of Fes el-Jdid before entering Fes el-Bali. This section is also known as the Oued al-Jawahir (Arabic: واد الجواهر, lit. 'River of Pearls'). It once passed through a flat area of marshes and wetlands located near what is now Fes el-Jdid and the modern Ville Nouvelle, before emerging at a number places. However, since the founding of Fes el-Jdid (13th century), the Oued al-Jawahir was progressively diverted and some of its old streams seem to have disappeared. The river's flow was re-engineered to provide water for the Royal Palace complex and a succession of royal gardens such as the Mosara Gardens of the Marinids (now disappeared) and the 19th-century Jnan Sbil Gardens (still extant), before continuing towards Fes el-Bali, where it is distributed across an extensive network of man-made streams and canals which end up at the Oued Bou Khrareb.

=== Oued Bou Khrareb ===
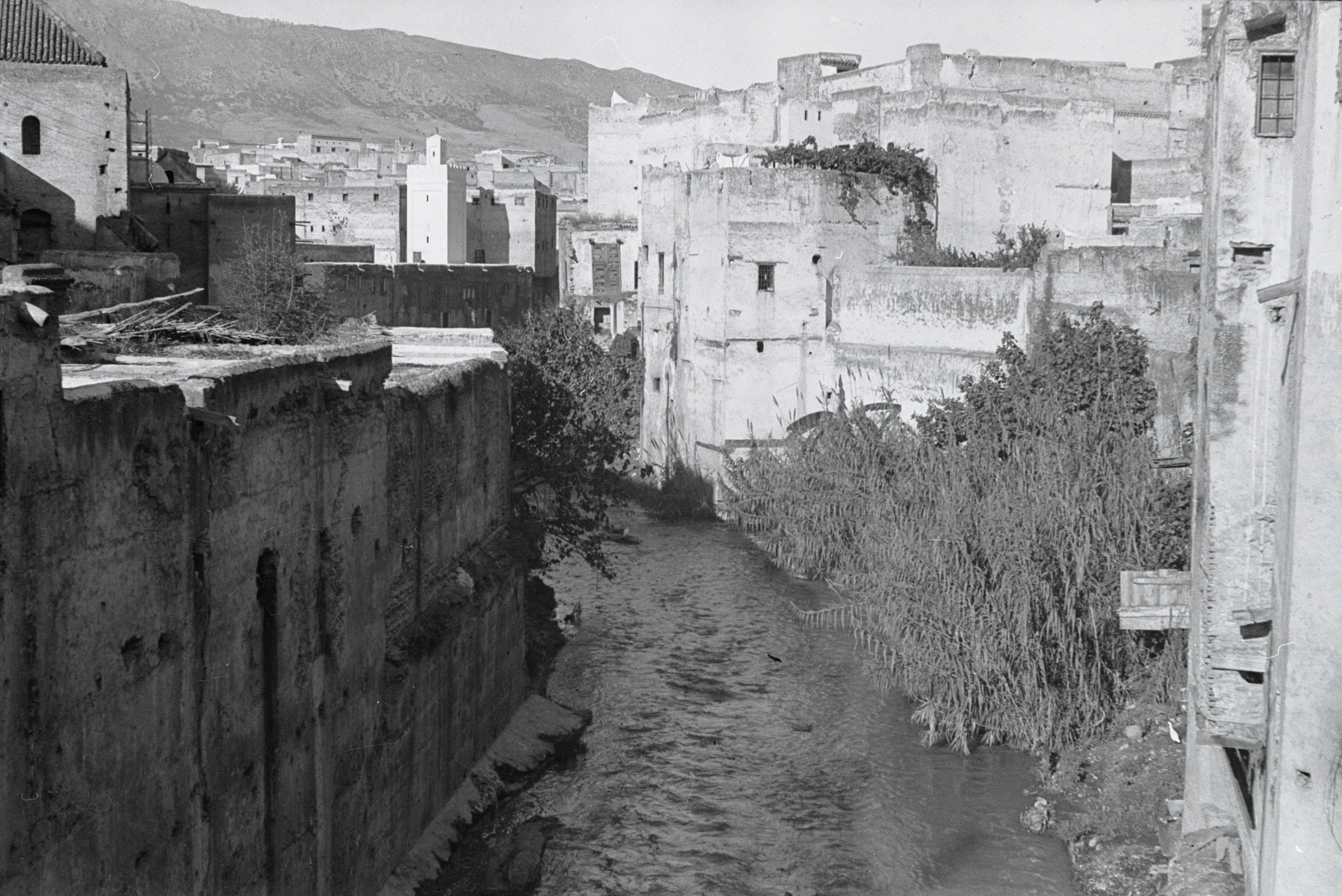
The Oued Bou Khrareb in a photograph from 1932

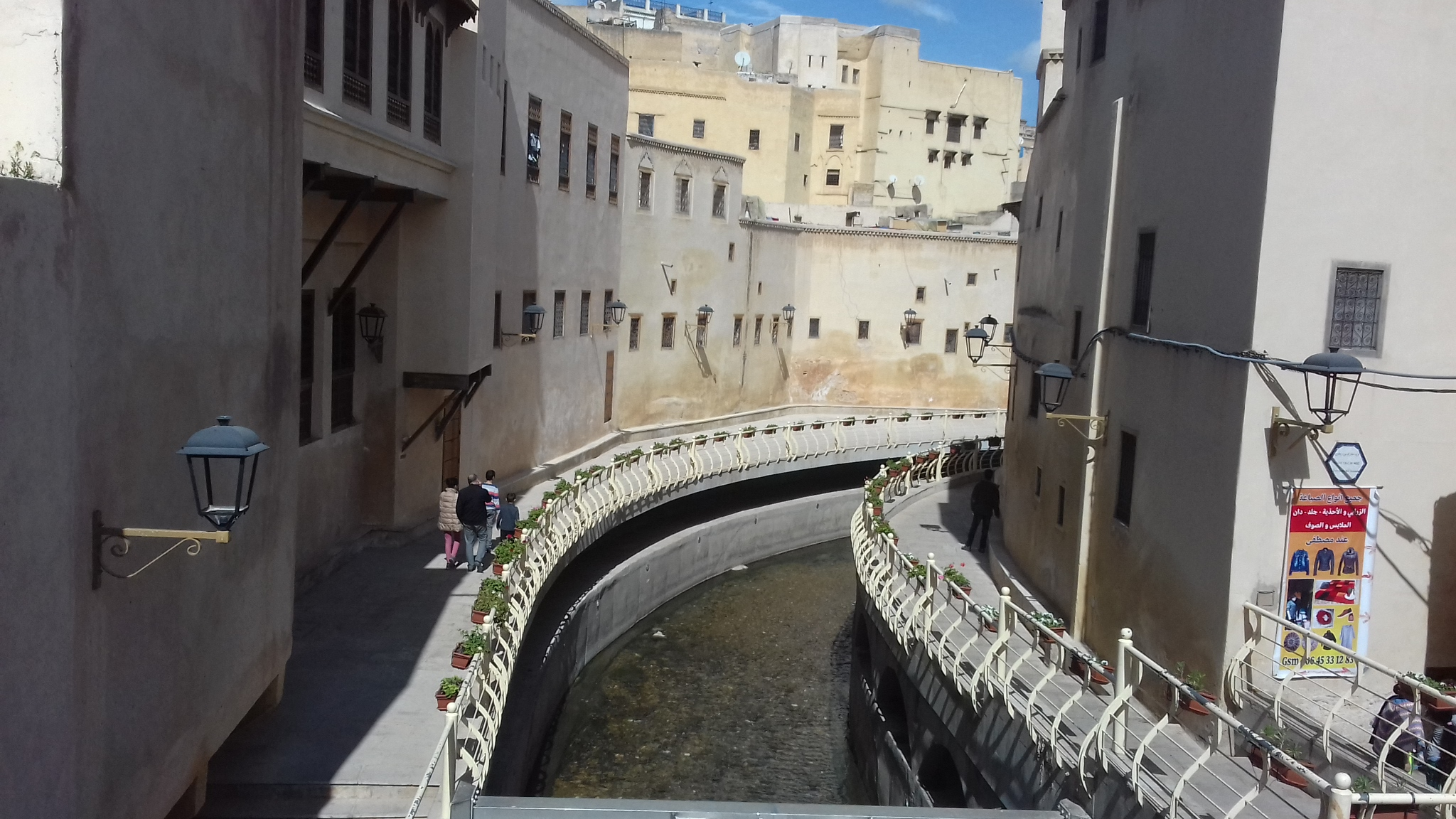
Oued Bou Khrareb in 2020

Oued Bou Khrareb (or sometimes Oued el-Kbir) is the usual name given to the main urban course of the river through the middle of Fes el-Bali. This river is initially fed by two other streams called the Oued ez-Zitoun and the Oued Bou Fekran that enter the city from the south at Bab Jdid. It is also fed by the various canals that split off from the Oued al-Jawahir to supply the city before eventually ending up in this ravine in the middle of the city. As the lowest point in the medina, the river thus acts as a collector for the city's used water.

The course of the Bou Khrareb also forms the historical boundary between the Qarawiyyin and Andalus quarters of the city, which were originally two separate cities (al-'Aliya and Madinat Fas) in their early history before being joined together by the Almoravids in the 11th century. Much of the Oued Bou Khrareb's course, from Bab Jdid to Place R'cif, is now hidden beneath a modern road for car traffic (one of the few that penetrates the medina). The road covers the river up to Place R'cif, a large square at the heart of the medina, and the river reemerges on the north side of square. From there the river runs northeast and exits the city between Bab Guissa and the former gate of Bab Sidi Bou Jida.

== The historic water network of Fez ==
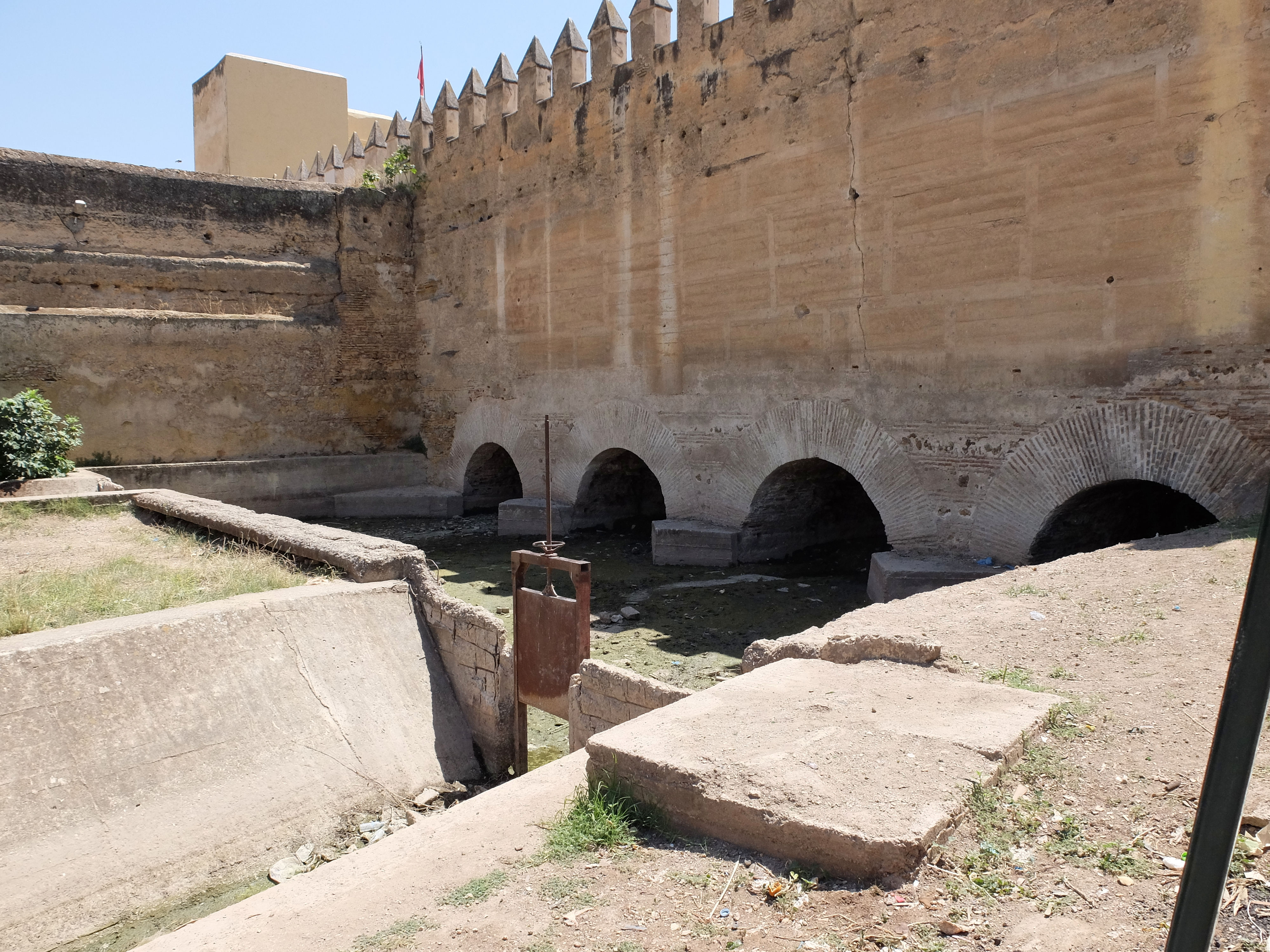
View of the Oued al-Jawahir's riverbed emerging from under the walls of the Old Mechouar (through the four arches on the right) in Fes el-Jdid. The first major divisions of the river (two canals visible in the foreground on the left) take place here and in the nearby Jnan Sbil Gardens.

Fes el-Bali has had access to plentiful water since its foundation. The current outlines of its water supply system were begun by the Zenata emir Dunas ibn Hamama between 1037 and 1049 and then further elaborated by the Almoravid emir Yusuf ibn Tashfin between 1069 (the Almoravid conquest of Fes) and 1106.

From the west, the Oued al-Jawahir flows eastward along the northern edge of Fes el-Jdid, passing through the Bab Bou Jat Mechouar, through the Dar al-Makina (a former arms factory), and then beneath the Old Mechouar near Bab Dekkakin before re-emerging on its eastern side, on the edge of the Jnan Sbil Gardens. Here it emerges from four arched openings at the bottom of the Old Mechouar's ramparts and the first major man-made division of the river take place. This division creates a number of canals (most of them subterranean) through Fes el-Bali which eventually spill back into the Oued Bou Khrareb (the name of the river's main course inside the city). There are four main historic canal divisions: the Oued Fejjalin, the Oued el-Hamiya, the Sakiyyat el-Abbasa, and the Oued Shrashar. Most of these then split off into other canals as they progress through the city. Within each network, water channels that supplied water for drinking and washing were kept separate from those that were used to evacuate waste.

The Oued Fejjalin is one of the most important divisions. It passes through the north part of the Jnan Sbil Gardens and through the Dar al-Beida Palace, before splitting into more branches. One branch goes south but has mostly disappeared today. The other, the Oued el-Lemtiyyin, continues northeastwards toward the Bou Jeloud area and supplied the northern parts of the city. Just after it enters the city walls, the water of the Oued el-Lemtiyyin is collected by a large distributor structure located adjacent to the south side of Bab Bou Jeloud gate. The structure is made of brick and rammed earth. It originally dates from the Almoravid period, although the wall on its west side is part of the Almohad city walls and some hydraulic features likely underwent modifications over the years as the city developed or the agreements regulating water distribution changed. It has three arched openings that lead into vaulted chambers under the wall from which the water then emerges on the other side into three open-air channels or "zones", located at different elevations. The middle zone consists of a large reservoir that feeds water into three underground canals on its eastern side. The two other zones, located on higher ground on either side of this, received lesser amounts of water but were more complex, consisting of multiple small basins and channels that regulated the distribution into local neighbourhoods. The differences in the depth and elevation of the different reservoirs and channels reflected the institutionalized water agreements under which certain neighbourhoods or buildings had priority access to water, while other sites, with less priority, only received it when the water level was high enough to reach the channels and reservoirs located at higher elevations. The water entering into the distributor was also slowed and diverted by small dams and settling basins, as well as by the various reservoirs themselves, which thus also served as a rudimentary water treatment system by catching and filtering garbage and other physical pollution. From this distributor, the water then spread through various underground canals across the neighbourhoods located downstream, starting with those in the Tala'a Kebira and Tala'a Seghira areas. One of the canals still passes through courtyard of the Bou Inania Madrasa today. Other distributor structures, of smaller size and complexity, were located throughout this network and other networks in order to further regulate water distribution.

As for the Oued el-Hamiya, it splits from the other major branches at Jnan Sbil before dividing into more branches which mostly supply the southern parts of the city. One of its branches also once supplied, via an aqueduct, the Andalus quarter on the opposite shore of the Bou Khrareb river. The two last branches, Sakiyyat al-Abbasa and the Oued Shrashar, supplied the regions near Bab al-Hadid and the gardens between Fes el-Jdid and Fes el-Bali.

In addition to this western network of canals coming from the Oued al-Jawahir, the streams to the south of the city (which also formed the beginning of the Bou Khrareb River) fed an entirely separate but important canal called the Oued Masmuda. This canal, further east, supplied water for most of the Andalus quarter of Fes on the southeast side of the Bou Khrareb river. It begins to the south of the city and passed through the old city walls through a culvert opening called Bab ash-Shobbak ("Gate of the Window") which was protected by an iron grille. A few other canals split from it as it wound its way through the district, until it finally rejoined the Bou Khrareb river shortly before its exit from the city. The canal appears to be named after the Masmuda Berber tribal confederacy that founded the Almohad movement, which suggests that it might have been constructed by the Almohads or that Masmuda families or troops were housed near it at some point.

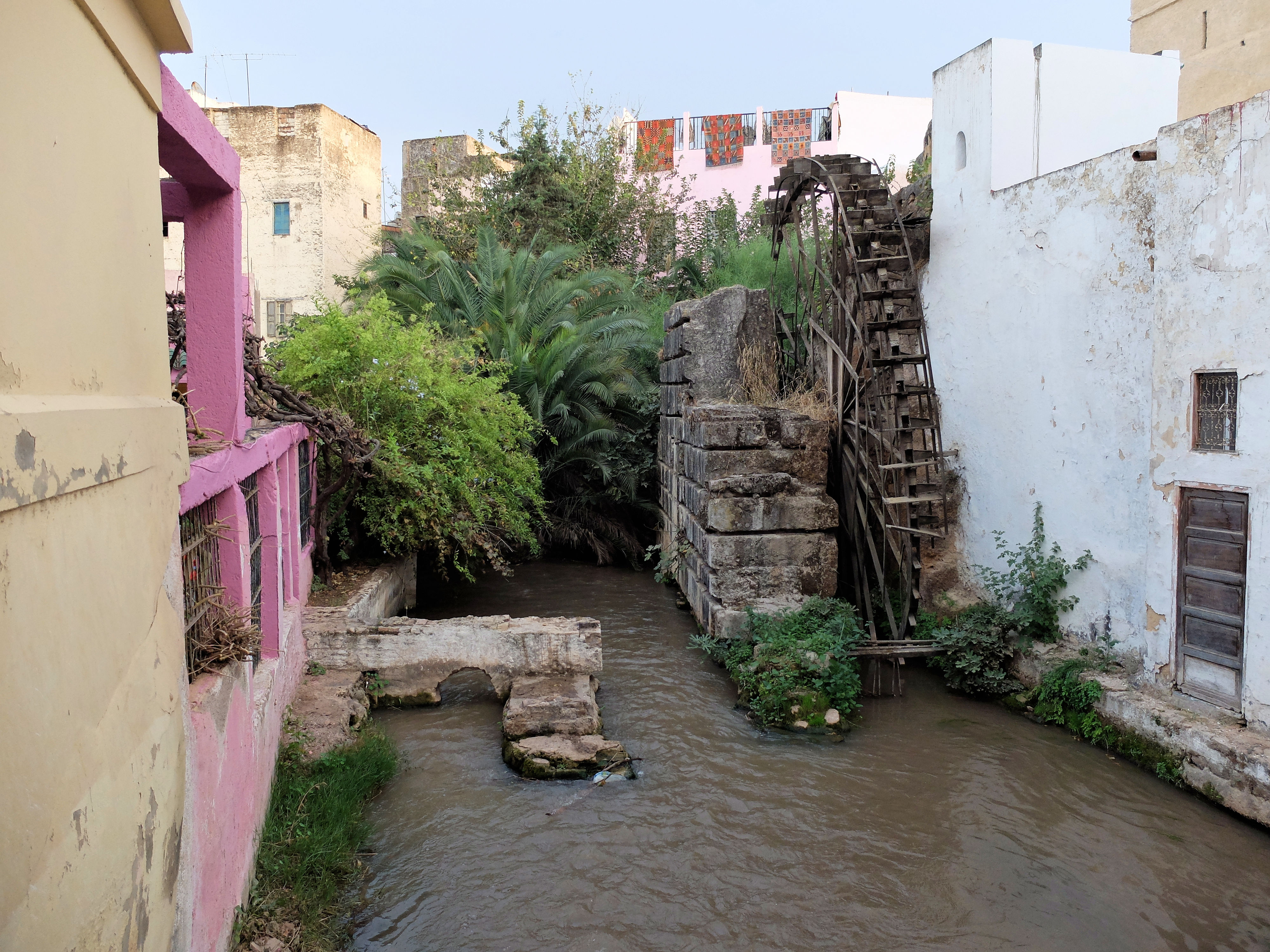
A historic noria (waterwheel) located on the western edge of the Jnan Sbil Gardens between Fes el-Jdid and Fes el-Bali.

Many of these historic canals are now underground, with only some ancient toponyms hinting at former bridges that passed over them (e.g. the name Qantrat Bou Rous along a part of Tala'a Kebira). These canals and streams also feed a number of industries such as the historic tanneries of the city, the most famous of which are the Chouara Tanneries. A large number of waterwheels (known as norias or sometimes as saqiyyas) were located throughout the city's water network in order to assist in water distribution or to power certain industries. Some of these were very large, such as the huge noria which supplied the Marinid royal gardens of Mosara, measuring 26 meters in diameter and 2 meters in thickness. Only a few of these waterwheels have survived in some form, including some examples around the Jnan Sbil Gardens.

== Historic bridges ==
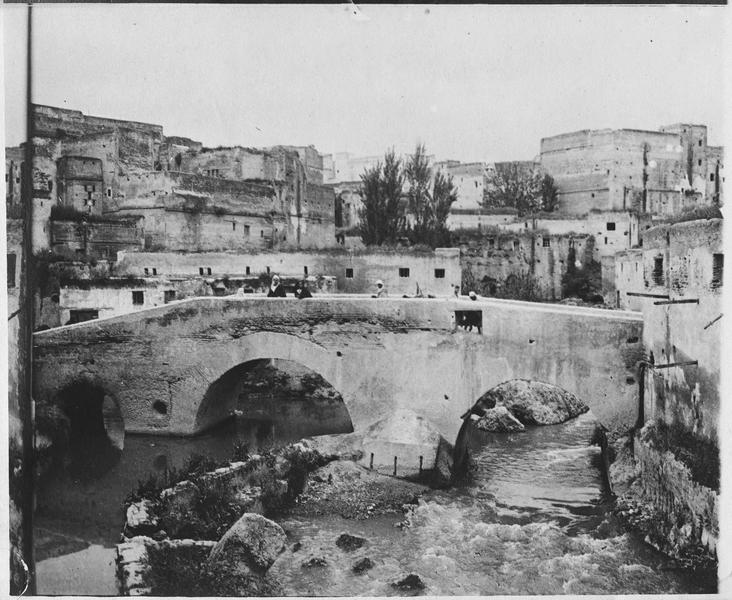
The Bin el-Mudun Bridge in a 1916 photo

The Oued Bou Khrareb is crossed by several historic bridges inside the medina, some of which were first built before the unification of the two shores into a single city in the 11th century. There were once at least six bridges, reportedly built by the Maghrawa ruler Dunas ibn Hamama in the early 11th century, before the unification of the two cities by the Almoravids later in the same century. They have since been repaired or rebuilt many times. The 14th-century historian Al-Jazna'i reported that the Almoravid ruler Yusuf Ibn Tashfin (d. 1106) built six bridges, which were named Abu Tuba, Abu Barquqa, Bab al-Silsila, Sebbaghin, Kahf al-Waqqadin, and er-Remila. Many of them were destroyed in the floods of 725 AH (1324 or 1325 CE) and some were subsequently rebuilt by the Marinid sultan at the time, Abu Sa'id (d. 1331). Some bridges have disappeared but their names have endured as local toponyms. A study by María Marcos Cobaleda and Dolores Villalba Sola states that two of the Almoravid bridges are still preserved. Historian Roger Le Tourneau estimated that the three main bridges today date back to the Almohad period at least.

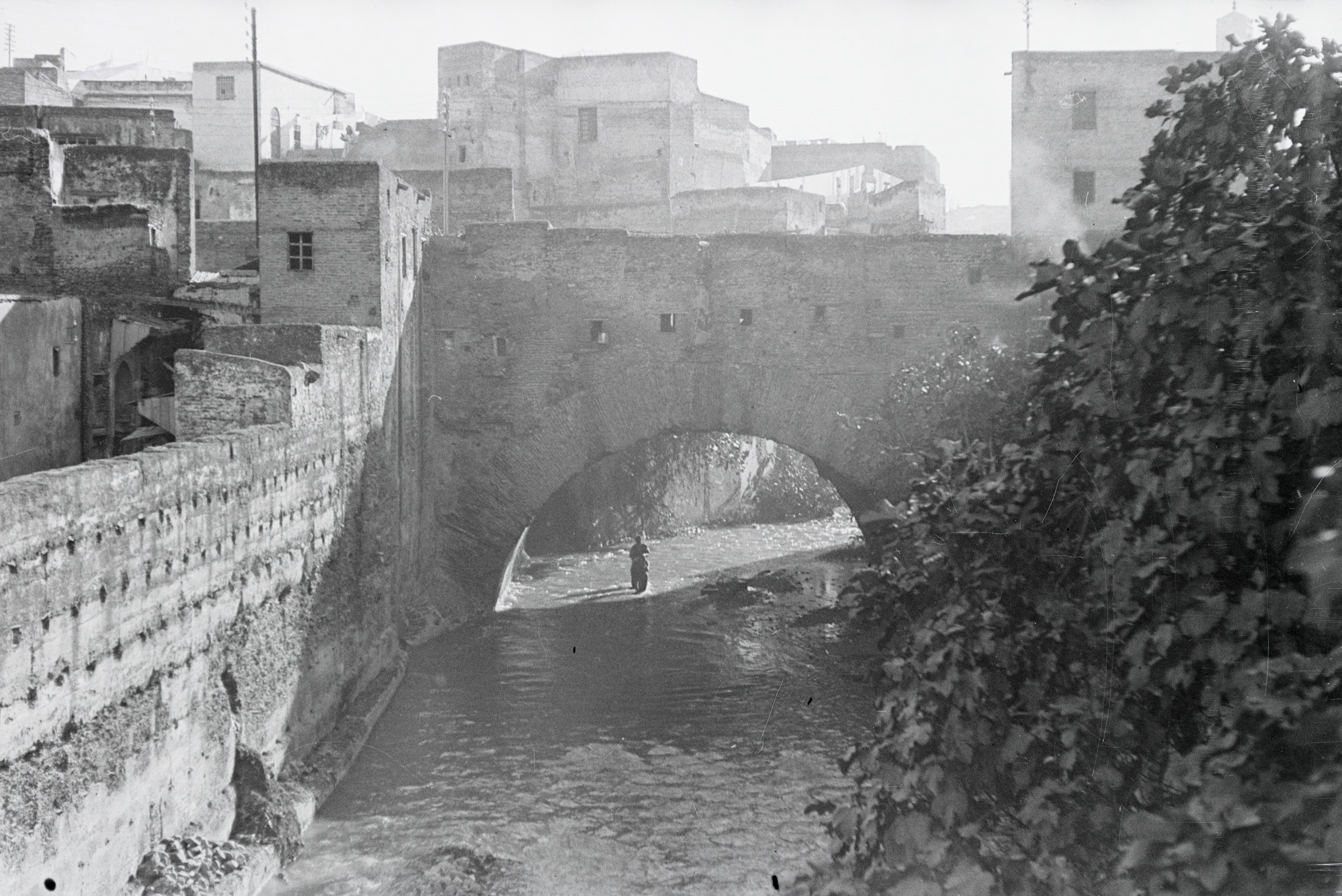
The Terrafin Bridge ("Bridge of the Cobblers") over the river in 1932. Today the bridge is located at the northern edge of Place R'cif.

Of the bridges that remain today, the Qantrat Bin el-Mudun ("Bridge Between the Two Cities") is the northernmost of them, followed to the south by the Qantrat Sebbaghin ("Bridge of the Tanners"; also known as the Bridge of Gzam Ben Zakkoun) and by the Qantrat Terrafin ("Bridge of the Cobblers") just north of Place R'cif.Another bridge, the Qantrat Sidi al-'Awwad ("Bridge of Sidi al-'Awwad"), was once located further south, in an area where the river is now covered by a paved road. Traditionally, the three most important bridges were those of Bin el-Mudun, Terrafin, and Sidi al-'Awwad, each of which were located along a major thoroughfare of the Andalus quarter (the eastern shore).

The Bin el-Mudun Bridge, believed to date from the time of Dunas ibn Hamama, was considered one of the most picturesque, being located amidst a stretch of rocky rapids. María Marcos Cobaleda and Dolores Villalba Sola attribute it to the Almoravid period. It has a span composed of three arches but only the central one is still visible today. The Sebbaghin Bridge, also known as the Khrashfiyin Bridge (or Khrachfiyine in French transliteration), is believed to have been originally built by Dunas ibn Hamama and restored or rebuilt by the Marinids in the 14th century. The Terrafin or al-Tarrafin bridge, originally named Qantrat Bab al-Silsila, is found on the northern edge of Place R'cif. It is also believed to date initially from Emir Dunas in the 11th century, while María Marcos Cobaleda and Dolores Villalba Sola attribute it to the Almoravid period as well. It is the only bridge in Fes to be lined with shops on both sides, similar to many medieval European bridges.

Preserved historic bridges over the Oued Bou Khareb

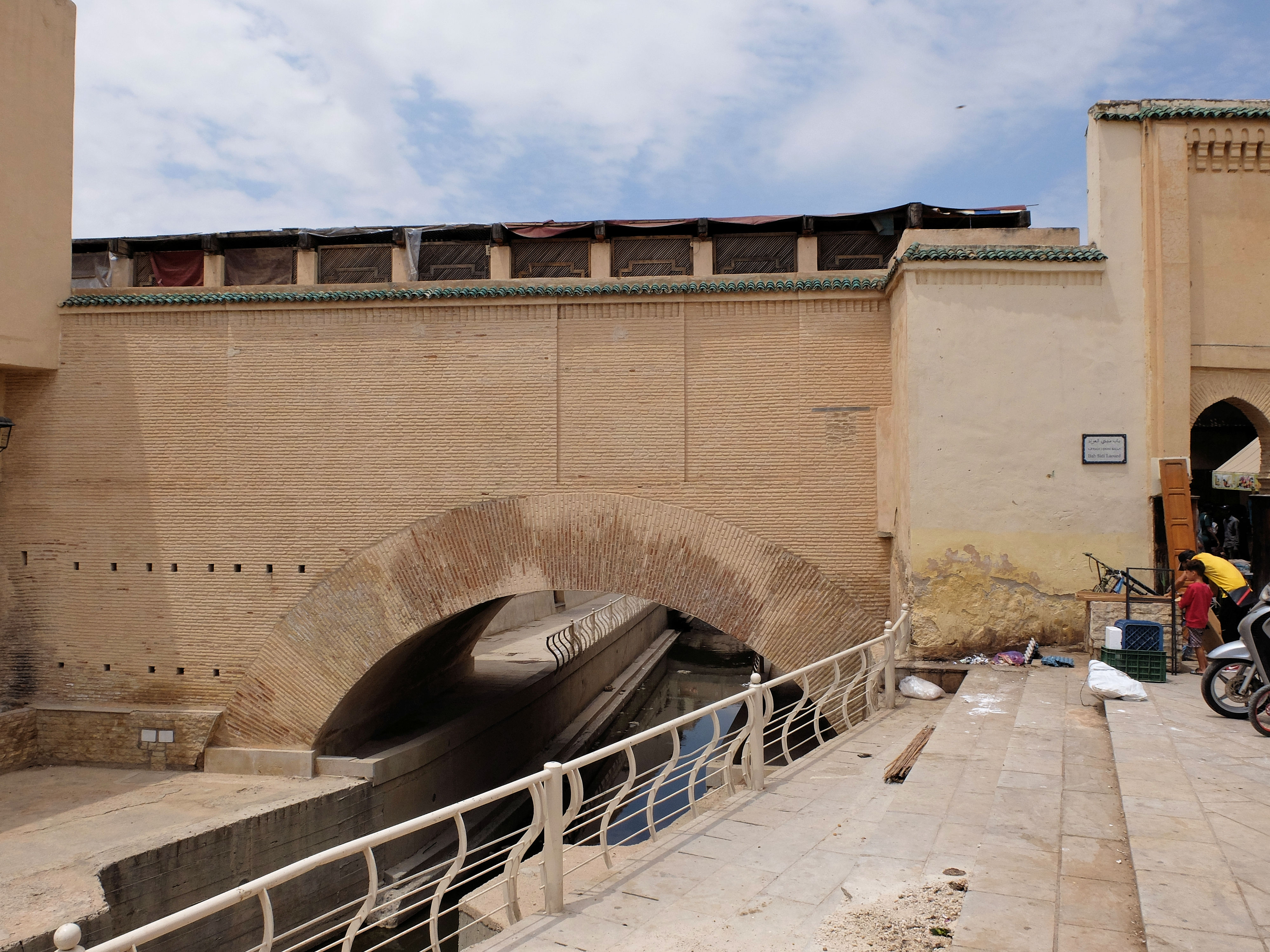
The Terrafin Bridge, located at the north end of Place R'cif (2023 photo)

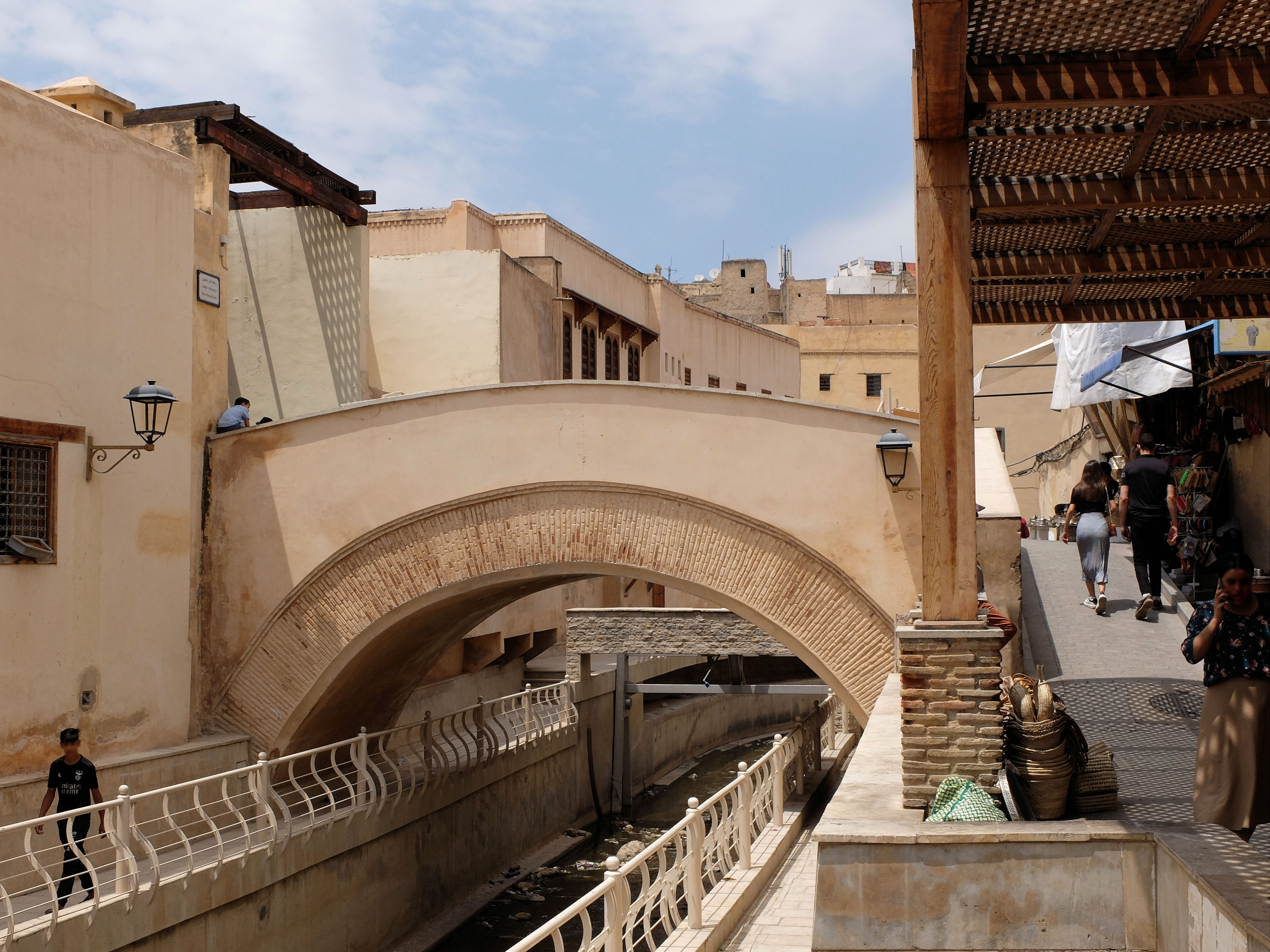
The Sebbaghin Bridge, located just north of the Terrafin Bridge (2023 photo)

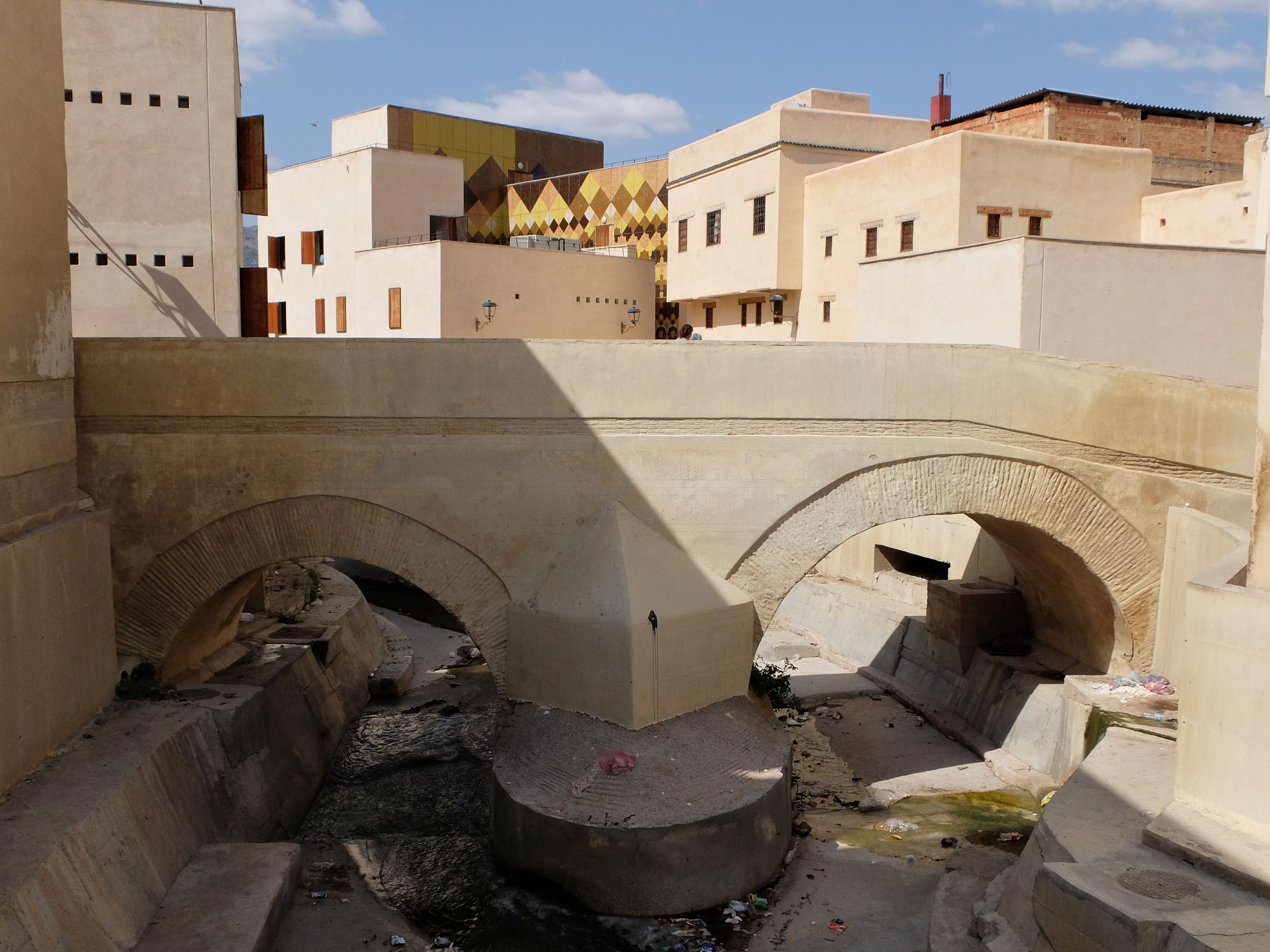
The Bin el-Mudun Bridge, located slightly south of the Chouara Tannery (2023 photo)

== Pollution problems and rehabilitation efforts ==
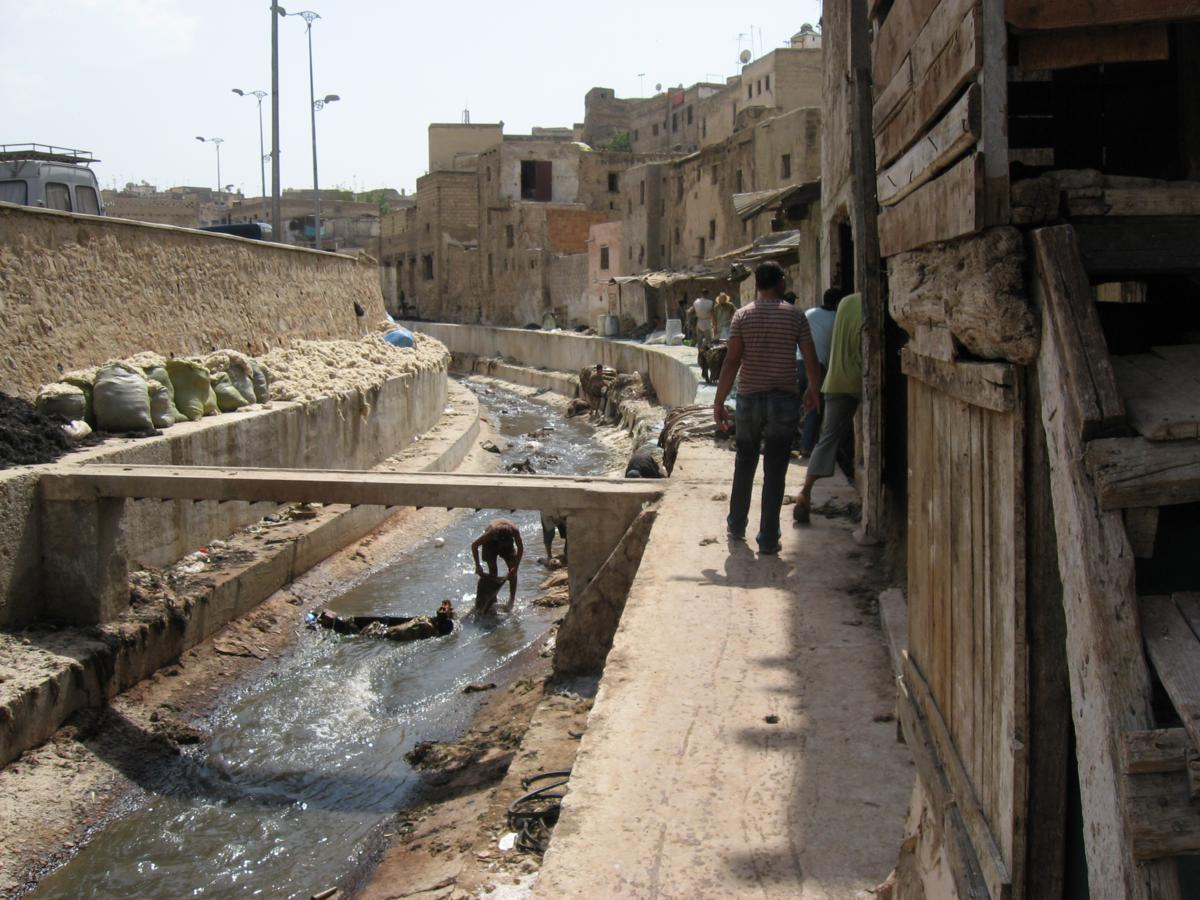
Traditional tanners are seen working along the Oued Bou Khrareb (2006; before recent renovations to the area).

The river, particularly the Oued Bou Khrareb within the old medina, has long suffered from heavy pollution due to sewage, the activities of the nearby tanneries (which generate chemical waste), and to being sometimes used as a dumping ground by residents. Even the name Oued Bou Khrareb means "River of Filth". The increase in pollution in modern times led to locals building walls and concrete barriers to block out the smell of the river, and more recently the city authorities had begun covering the exposed parts of the river with concrete slabs, which only led to more garbage piling up on top of this. The waste of the tanning industry and other activities also led to toxic chemicals, particularly high levels of Chromium, accumulating in the soil and the water. Although it is believed that this does not affect the city's drinking water (which comes from upstream), it creates problems for sites downstream along the Sebou River following its confluence with the Oued Fes.

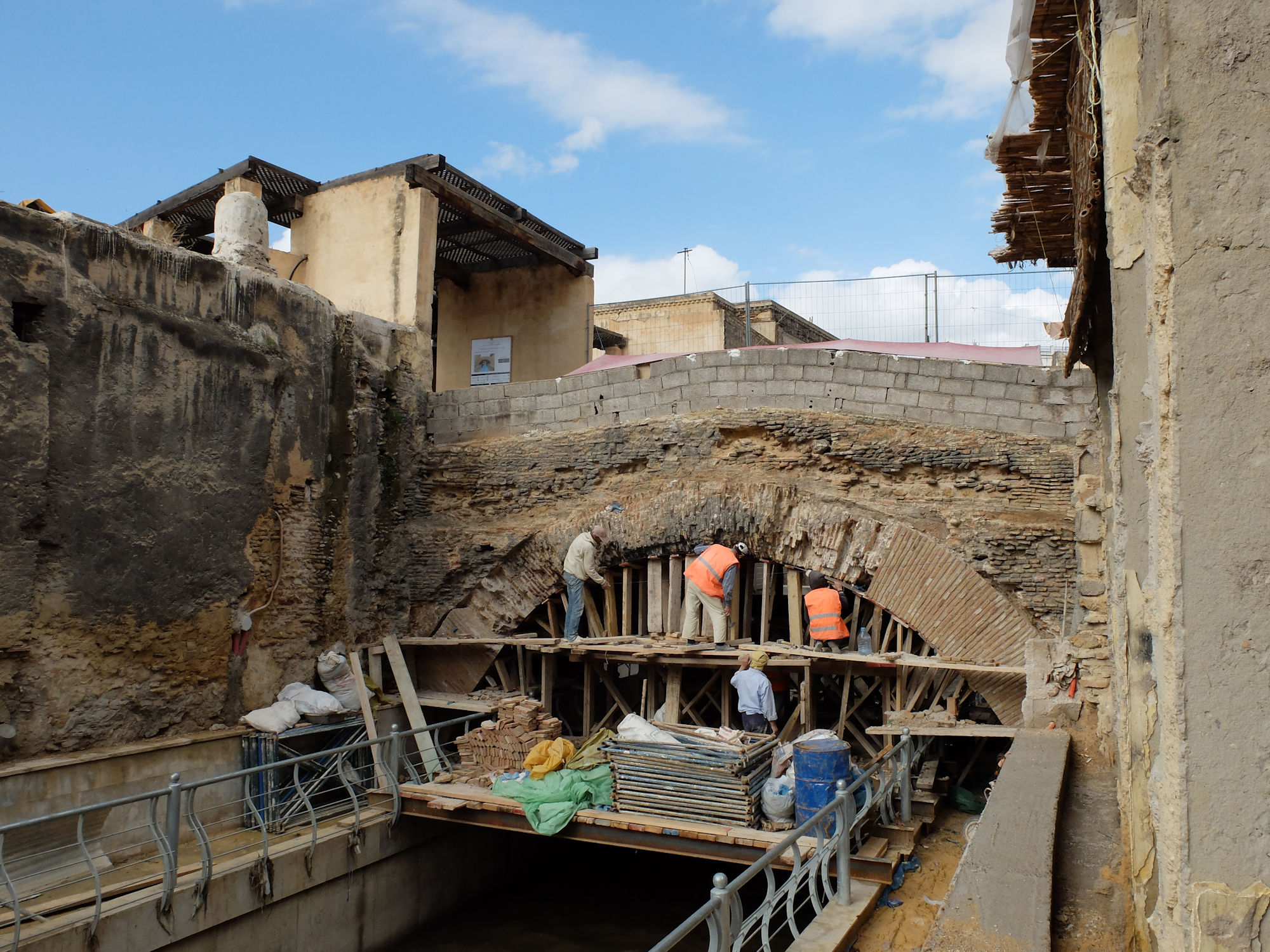
The Sebbaghin Bridge undergoing restoration in November 2014

In the late 2000s, a large-scale project to rehabilitate the river system and its urban environment was begun. The project, led by architect Aziza Chaouni, included the cleaning up of the river, the renovation of its urban shoreline, the creation of open pedestrian walkways, and the renovation of existing open spaces along the river such as Place R'cif and Place Lalla Yeddouna. The proposal to improve water quality also included the creation of wetlands (which had previously existed along the river's course) and the restoration of the river's canals. At one point the project had also proposed to end or curtail the operations of the Chouara Tanneries and relocate the tanning industry elsewhere where its pollution could be managed more safely, but in the end the tanneries were restored and left in place.

The rehabilitation of the river, which has been underway since, also took place alongside broader efforts to restore the historical monuments and landmarks of the old city, mostly under the direction of the local heritage restoration agency ADER-Fes. This included the restoration of the bridges over the Bou Khrareb river, with the Terrafin and Sebbaghin/Khrashfiyin bridges being restored in the 2010s.
