= Chouara Tannery =

Moroccan tannery in Fez

Coordinates: 34°3′57.92″N 4°58′15.52″W

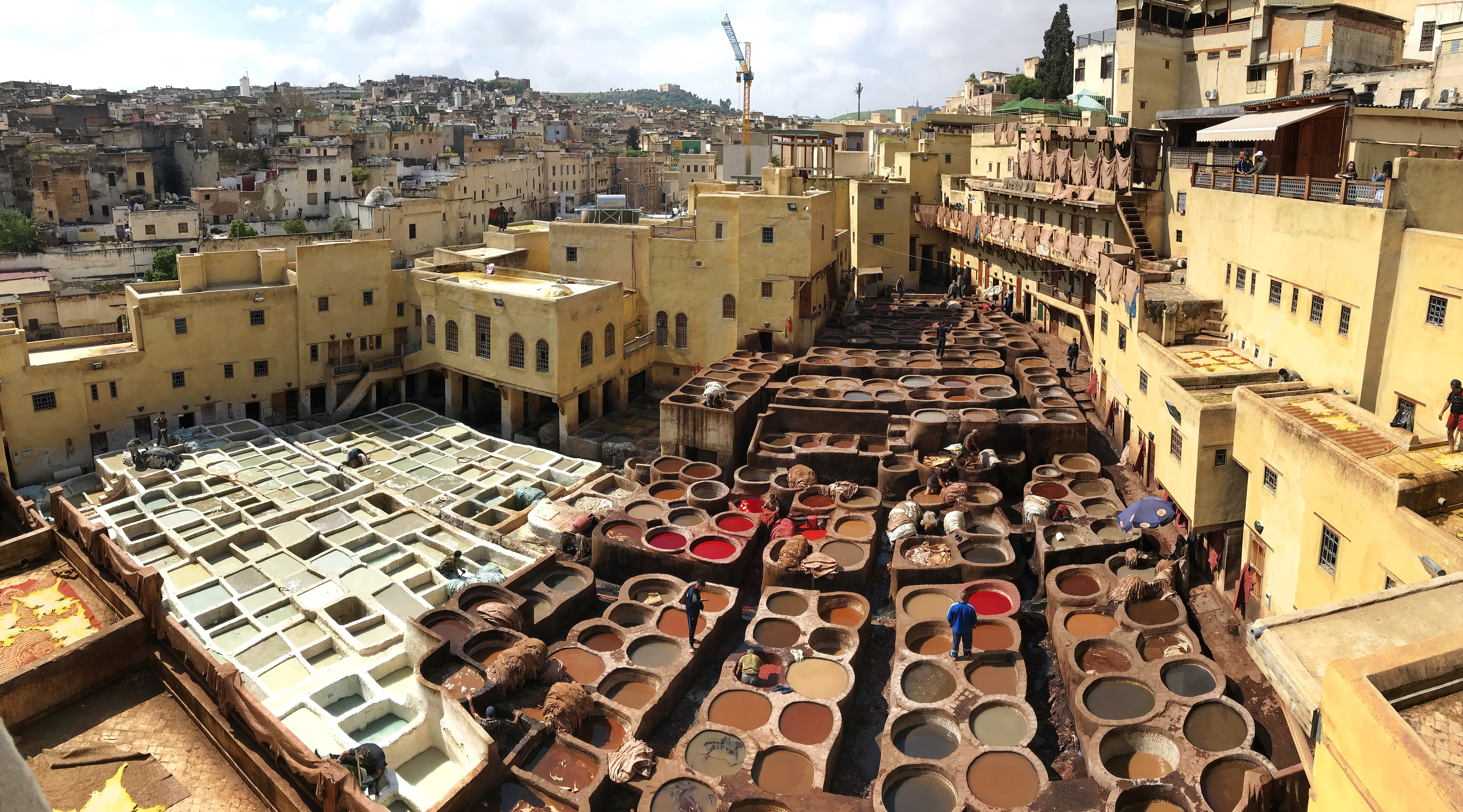
General view of the Chouara Tannery (following recent renovations)

Chouara Tannery (sometimes spelled Chouwara) is one of the three tanneries in the city of Fez, Morocco. It is the largest tannery in the city and one of the oldest. It is located in Fes el Bali, the oldest medina quarter of the city, near the Saffarin Madrasa along the Oued Fes (also known as the Oued Bou Khrareb). Since the inception of the city, the tanning industry has been continually operating in the same fashion as it did in the early centuries. Today, the tanning industry in the city is considered one of the main tourist attractions. The tanneries are packed with round stone vessels filled with dye or white liquids for softening the hides. The leather goods produced in the tanneries are exported around the world.

== History ==
Local tradition generally holds that the Chouara Tannery, as well as the Sidi Moussa Tannery southwest of the Zawiya of Moulay Idris, date from the city's foundation by Idris II (beginning of the 9th century). Historical texts make reference to the Sidi Moussa Tannery more definitely in the early 12th century, but the age of the Chouara Tannery is more unclear and the earlier history of either tannery is not firmly established. Modern historians have said that there isn't clear evidence for where the city's earliest tanneries were located but that tanneries did likely exist soon after the city's foundation and would likely have been located near the main river or near other natural water sources just as they are today.

Historical sources show that the tanneries were a major industry even in the city's early history and tied to a large part of its economy. The products of the city's tanneries were also prestigious enough that they were reportedly exported all the way to Baghdad. Al-Jazna'i claims that the Almohads (late 12th to early 13th century) counted a total of 86 tanning workshops in the city, while a later source claims that there were around a hundred in the Marinid period (late 13th to 15th centuries). The tanneries, including the Chouara Tannery, continued to be expanded or modified on several occasions even into modern times. In addition to the Chouara and Sidi Moussa Tanneries, the Ain Azliten Tannery, located in the north of the city, was also created at the end of the 18th century.

== Description ==
The most notable feature of Chouara and the other local tanneries is the numerous stone vats filled with different colored dyes and white liquids. Hides of cows, sheep, goats, and camels are processed by first soaking in a series of the white liquids – made from various mixtures of cow urine, pigeon feces, quicklime, salt, and water – in order to clean and soften the tough skins. This process takes two to three days and prepares the hides to readily absorb the dyes. They are then soaked in the dyeing solutions, which use natural colorants such as poppy for red, indigo for blue, and henna for orange. After the dyeing, they are dried under the sun. The resulting leather is then sold to other craftsmen, who use it to produce Morocco's famed leather goods, such as bags, coats, shoes, and slippers, prized for their high quality. The entire leather production process comprises manual labor only and involves no modern machinery, and has retained methods unchanged since medieval times.

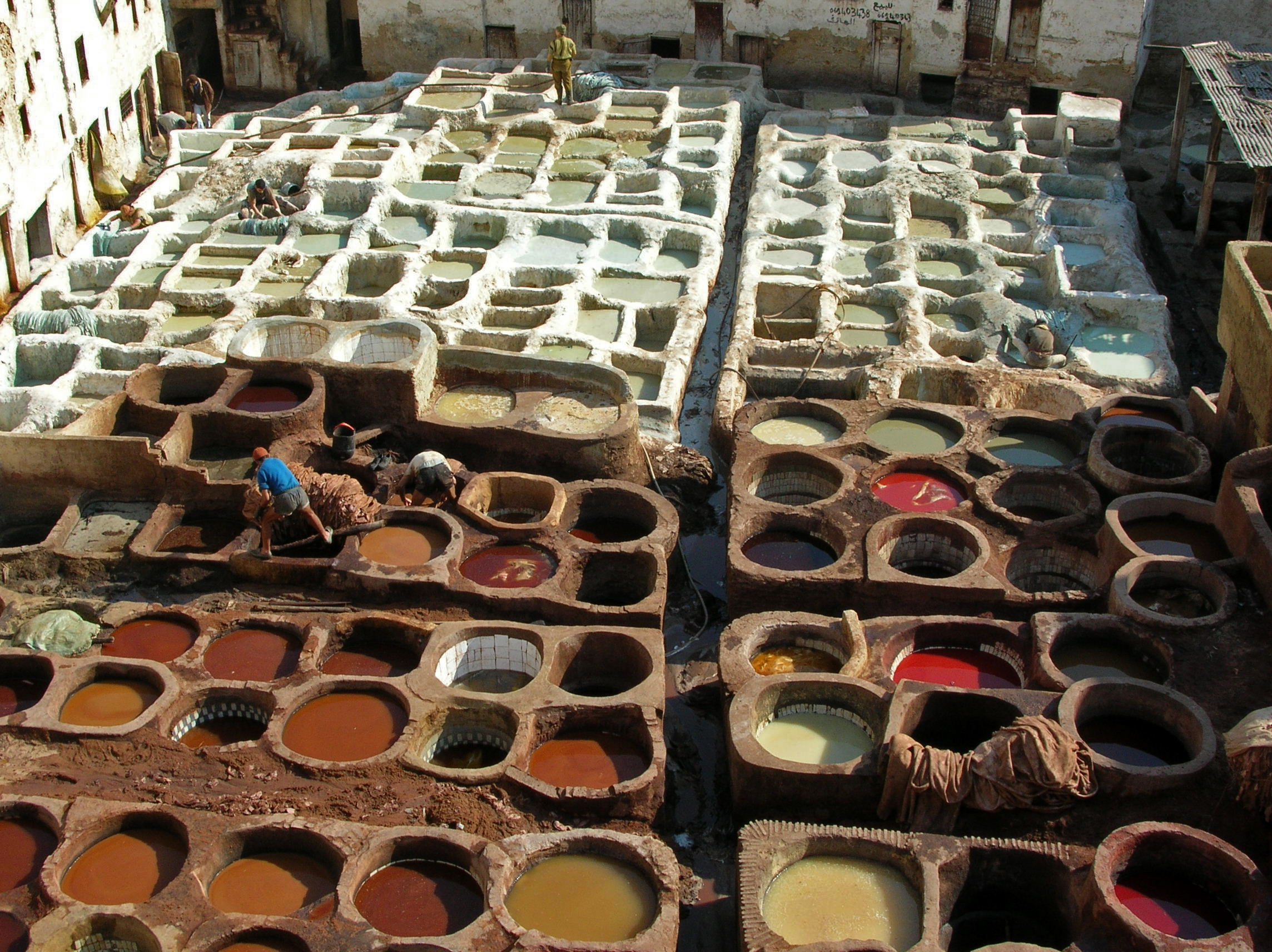
The vats: softening liquids (above) and dyes (below)

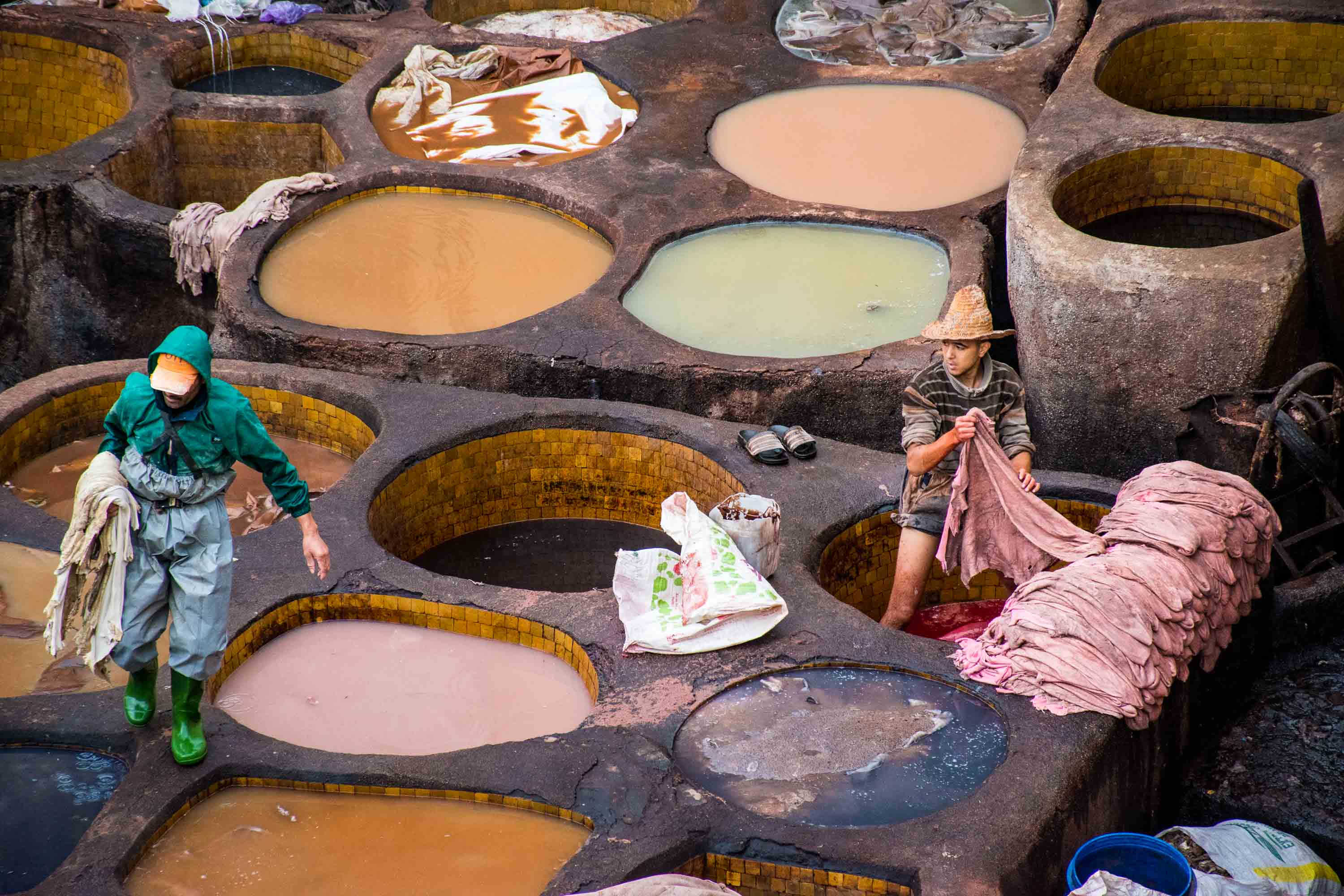
Men dyeing leather in the stone vessels of the tannery

== Pollution and health concerns ==
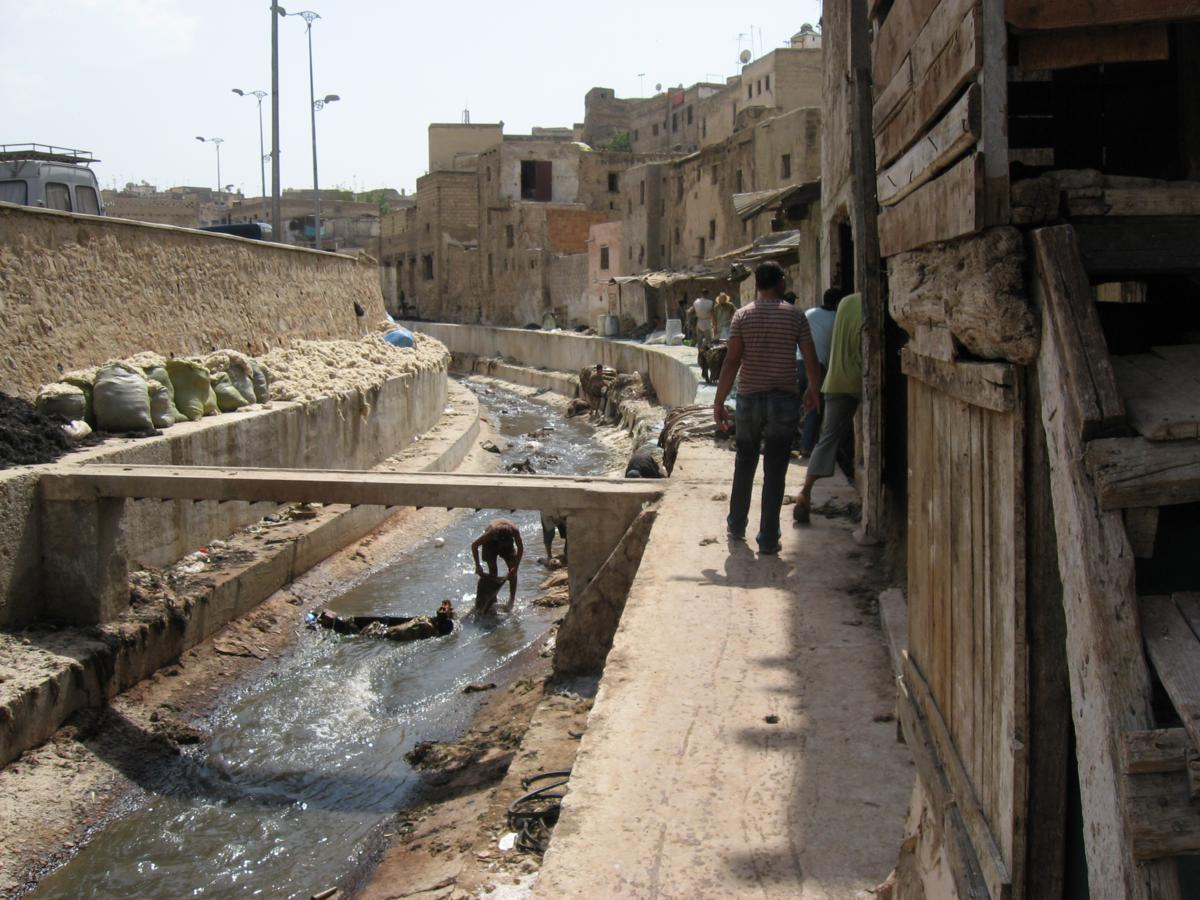
Tannery workers washing skins in the Oued Bou Khareb (photo from 2006; before recent renovations to the area).

Tanneries have historically always been treated as polluting due to the waste runoff and the strong smells they create. Since the 19th century the tanneries have made extensive use of chromium in order to aid the tanning process. Certain types of chromium are toxic and the tanneries produce various other organic waste, which has resulted in large amounts of pollution contaminating the soil and the rivers downstream. Tannery workers and other locals have long complained of adverse health effects, with the most serious cases leading to cancer and early death.

In the 21st century, a widescale project led by Aziza Chaouni was launched to rehabilitate the Fez River by improving its urban environment and attempting to control the amount of pollution. At one point the project had proposed to end or curtail the operations of the Chouara Tannery and relocate the tanning industry to another location where its pollution could be managed more safely, while the tanneries themselves would be converted to a different economic model or potentially reused as a public space. In the end, however, the tanneries were restored and left in place.
