= Temim ibn Ziri =

5th Emir of the Banu Ifran

- Emir of the Ifrenids; Emir of Tlemcen

5th Emir of the Banu Ifran
- Reign: 1029-1035
- Predecessor: Habbous
- Successor: Hammad ibn Temim
- Born: Abu Kamal Temim ibn Ziri ibn Yala Al-Ifreni; 986; Algeria
- Died: 1054-55; Chellah, Morocco
- Dynasty: Banu Ifran
- Father: Ziri ibn Yala
- Religion: Sunni Islam

Abu Kamal Temim bin Ziri bin Ya'la Al-Yafrani, was the leader of the Berber Zenata tribe known as Banu Ifren from 1029 to 1035 during the Middle Ages in the Maghreb. He is the grandson of Yala Ibn Mohammed.

== Life ==
He is known for the construction of the Grand Mosque of Salé in 1028, which was later reconstructed by the Almohads in the 12th century.

In 1029, Temim expedited to Tamesna where he eradicated false Barghawata doctrines, expelled half of the population, enslaving the rest, and established his residence there He is also known for building the city of Salé in 1030.

In 1033, Temim, leading troops of the Banu Ifran, seized Fez, Morocco from under Maghrawa leader Hammama. Hammama was forced to flee to Oujda. There, Temim perpetrated the 1033 Fez massacre, killing 6,000 Moroccan Jews, seizing their possessions, burning their homes, and enslaving their women. Hammama rallied his forces and reconquered Fez in 1039. After fleeing, Temim conquered the city of Chellah, extending his control as far as Tadla.

== Death ==
Temim died in 1054–55 in Salé, specifically in Chellah, which he had conquered after fleeing from Hammama in 1038–39. He was succeeded by his son Hammad.
