= Sidi Moussa Tannery =

Coordinates: 34°3′51.3″N 4°58′33.7″W

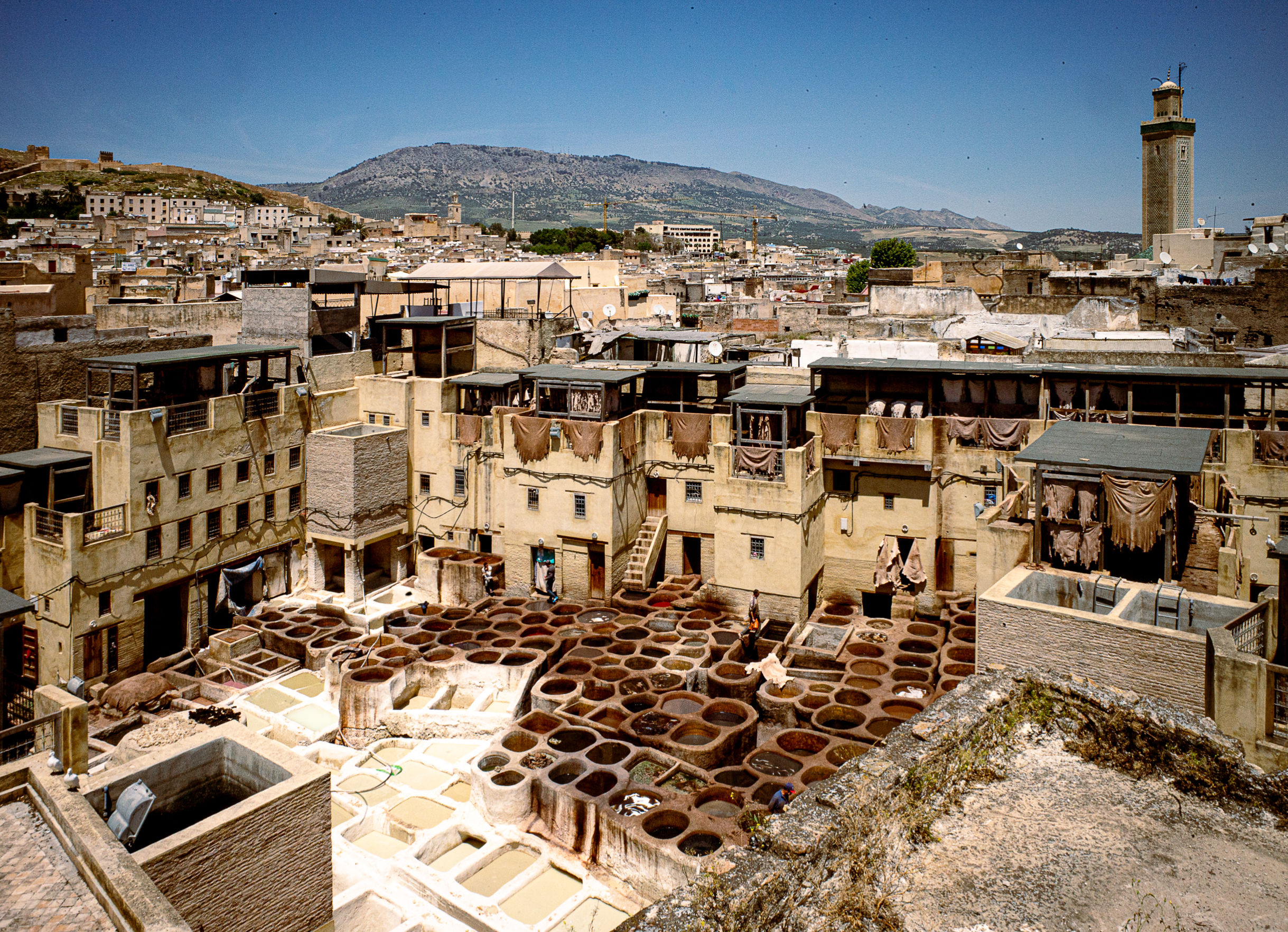
View of the Sidi Moussa Tannery (photograph from 2020, after recent restorations)

The Sidi Moussa Tannery or Guerniz Tannery is a historic tanning facility located in the heart of Fes el-Bali, the historic medina of Fez, Morocco. The tannery is located in the Guerniz neighbourhood, near the Zawiya of Moulay Idris II and the Nejjarine Museum.

== History ==
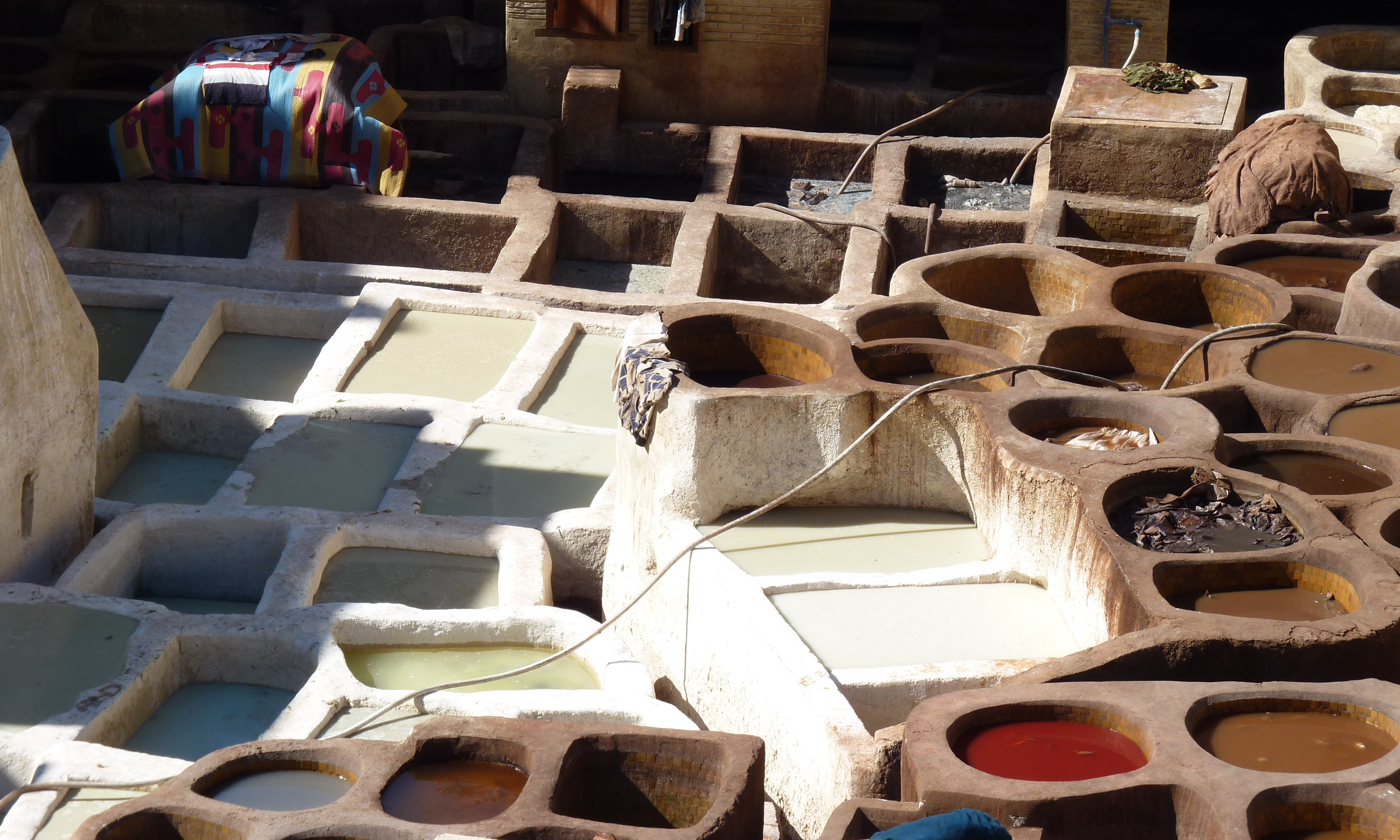
The tanning vats

Local tradition holds that the Sidi Moussa Tannery is the oldest in the city and that, along with the Chouara Tannery further east, it dates from the city's foundation by Idris II (beginning of the 9th century). The Rawd al-Qirtas, a historical chronicle, makes more definitive reference to the Sidi Moussa Tannery's existence in the early 12th century. The tanneries are built on the site of water source (called 'Ayn ad-Debbaghin) that emerges at this location.

Historical sources show that tanneries were a major industry even in the city's early history and were tied to a large part of its economy. The products of the city's tanneries were valued enough that they were exported all the way to Baghdad. Al-Jazna'i claims that the Almohads (late 12th to early 13th century) counted a total of 86 tanning workshops in the city, while a later source claims that there were around a hundred in the Marinid period (late 13th to 15th centuries). Historically, the Sidi Moussa Tannery specialized in treating cow skins.

The city's tanneries continued to be expanded or modified on several occasions even into modern times. In recent years the tanneries of the city have undergone restorations alongside efforts to reduce the amount of pollution they generate within the medina. Physical and structural restorations of the Sidi Moussa Tannery were completed in 2015. As part of this restoration effort, a new plan was also drawn up to lessen the most polluting activities at the tannery by having some steps of the tanning process take place at new facilities outside the old city instead. This move was scheduled to be completed by the end 2018.
