= Funduq Shamma'in =

Caravanserai in Fez, Morocco

Coordinates: 34°03′51.9″N 4°58′26.8″W

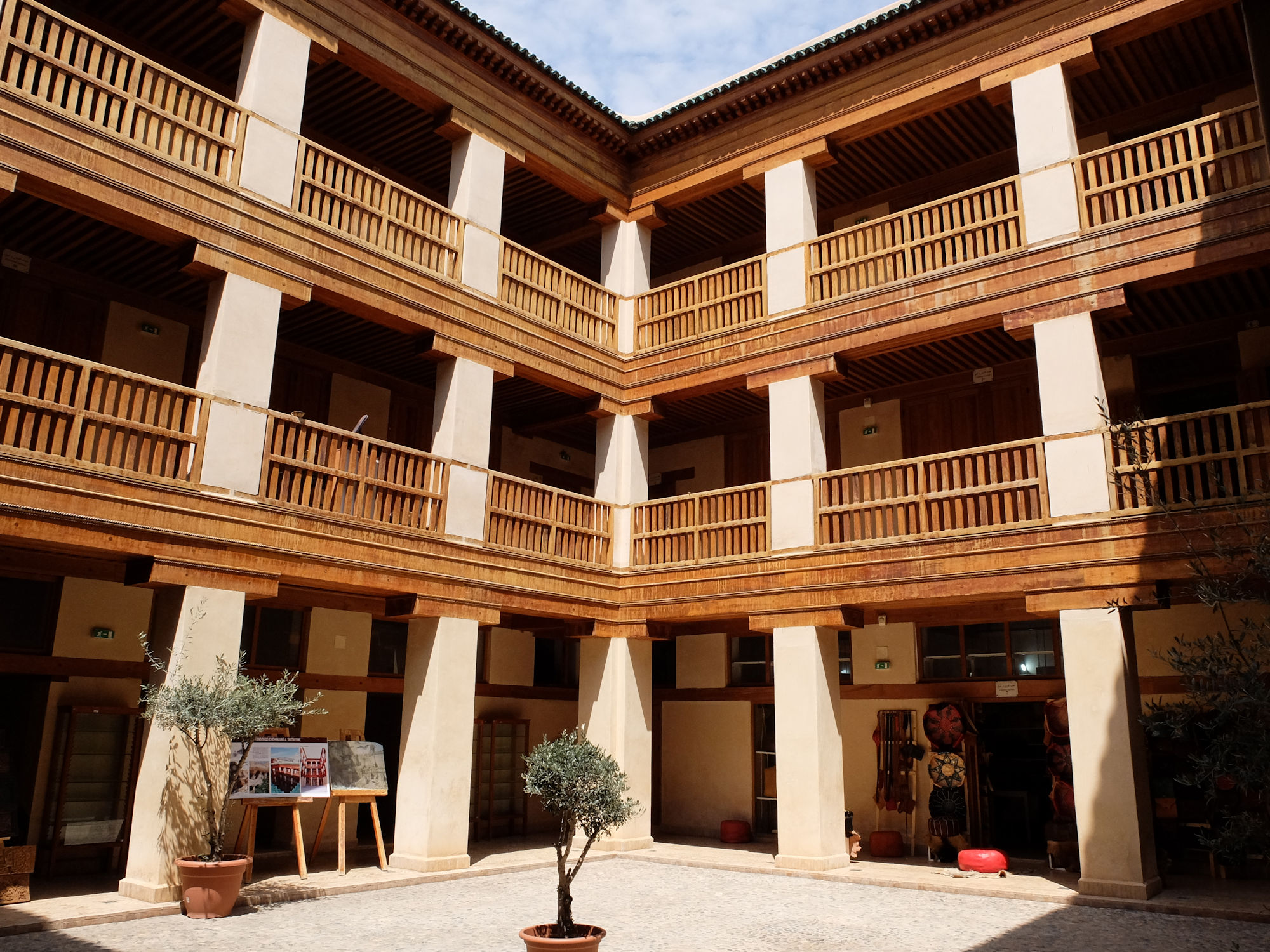
Interior of the Funduq Shamma'in

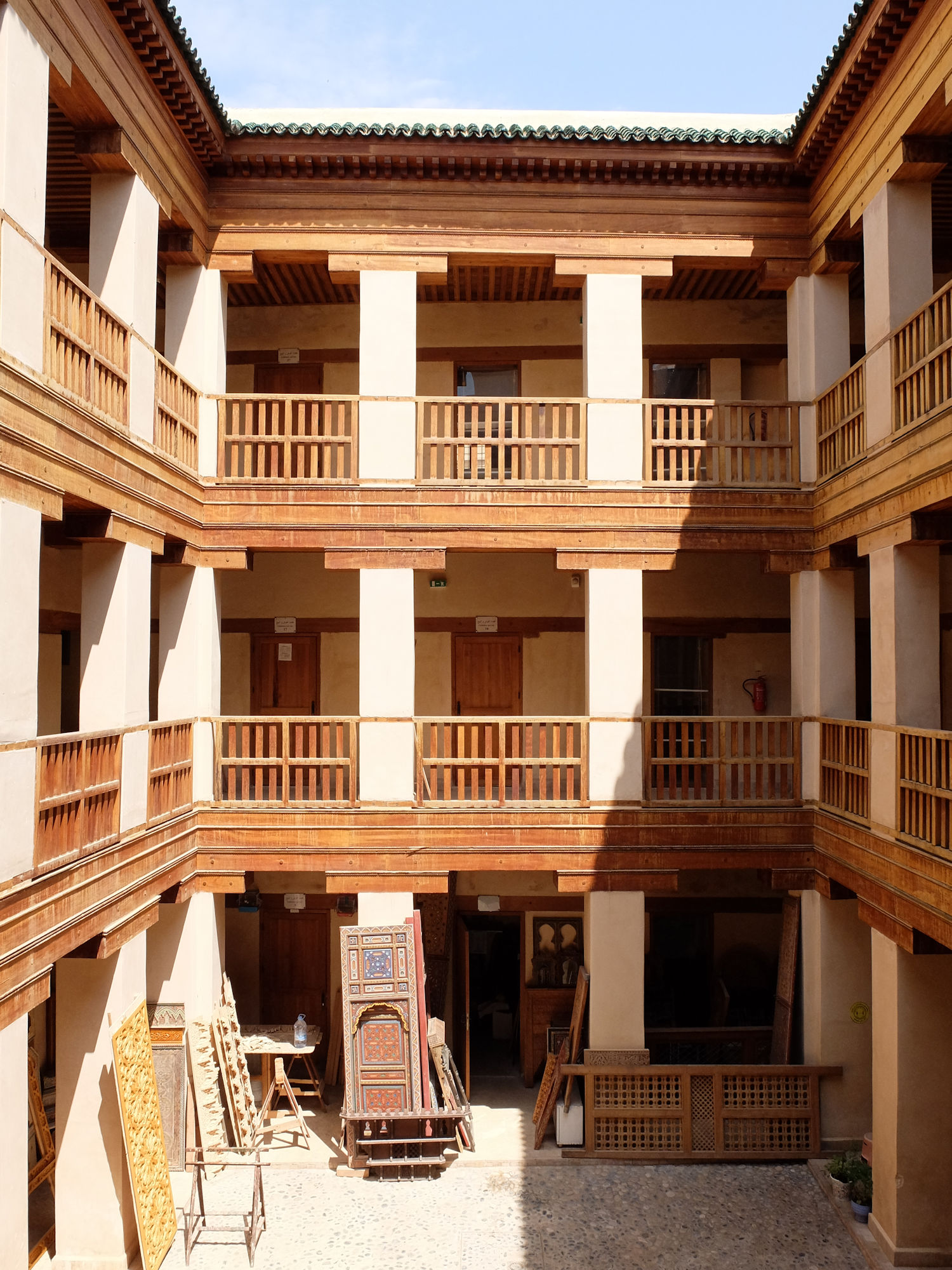
Interior of the Funduq Sbitriyyin

The Funduq al-Shamma'in or Foundouk Chemmaïne (Arabic: فندق الشماعين, romanized: funduq ash-shama'in, lit. 'hotel of the candle-makers') is a medieval funduq (urban caravanserai) in Fes, Morocco. It is also directly adjoined by another funduq structure, the Funduq al-Sbitriyyin. Together, the two form a combined architectural complex sometimes referred to as the Funduq Shamma'in-Sbitriyyin (or Foundouk Chemmaine-Sbitriyine). Both are located side by side just west of the al-Qarawiyyin Mosque in the heart of the historic medina, Fes el-Bali.

== Origin of name ==
The name Funduq ash-Shamma'in (Arabic: فندق الشماعين) means "inn/hotel of the candle-makers", referring to the souq (market) of the candle-makers situated along the street of the same name on the north side of the building. The souq name is also shared with the nearest gate and entrance of the al-Qarawiyyin Mosque, Bab al-Shamma'in (Arabic: باب الشماعين), which was crafted in the Almoravid period.

The name of the adjacent funduq, Sbitriyyin, means "string-makers", referring to the market for these vendors situated in the alley on the east side of the funduqs. Once again, one of the entrance doors to the Qarawiyyin Mosque, Bab Sbitriyyin, at the end of this lane, is named after them.

== History ==
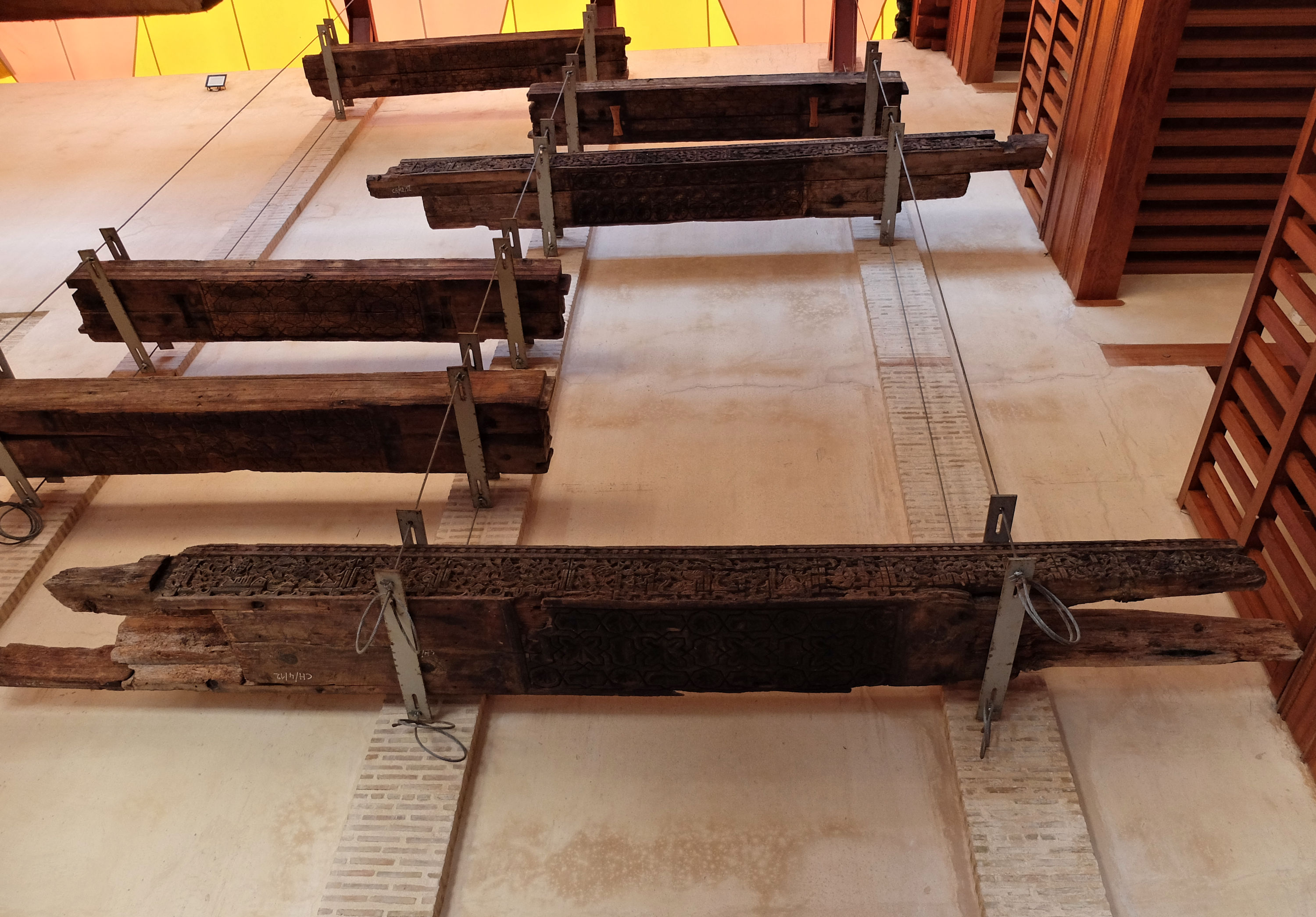
Elements of preserved original woodwork on display inside Funduq Shamma'in since its restoration

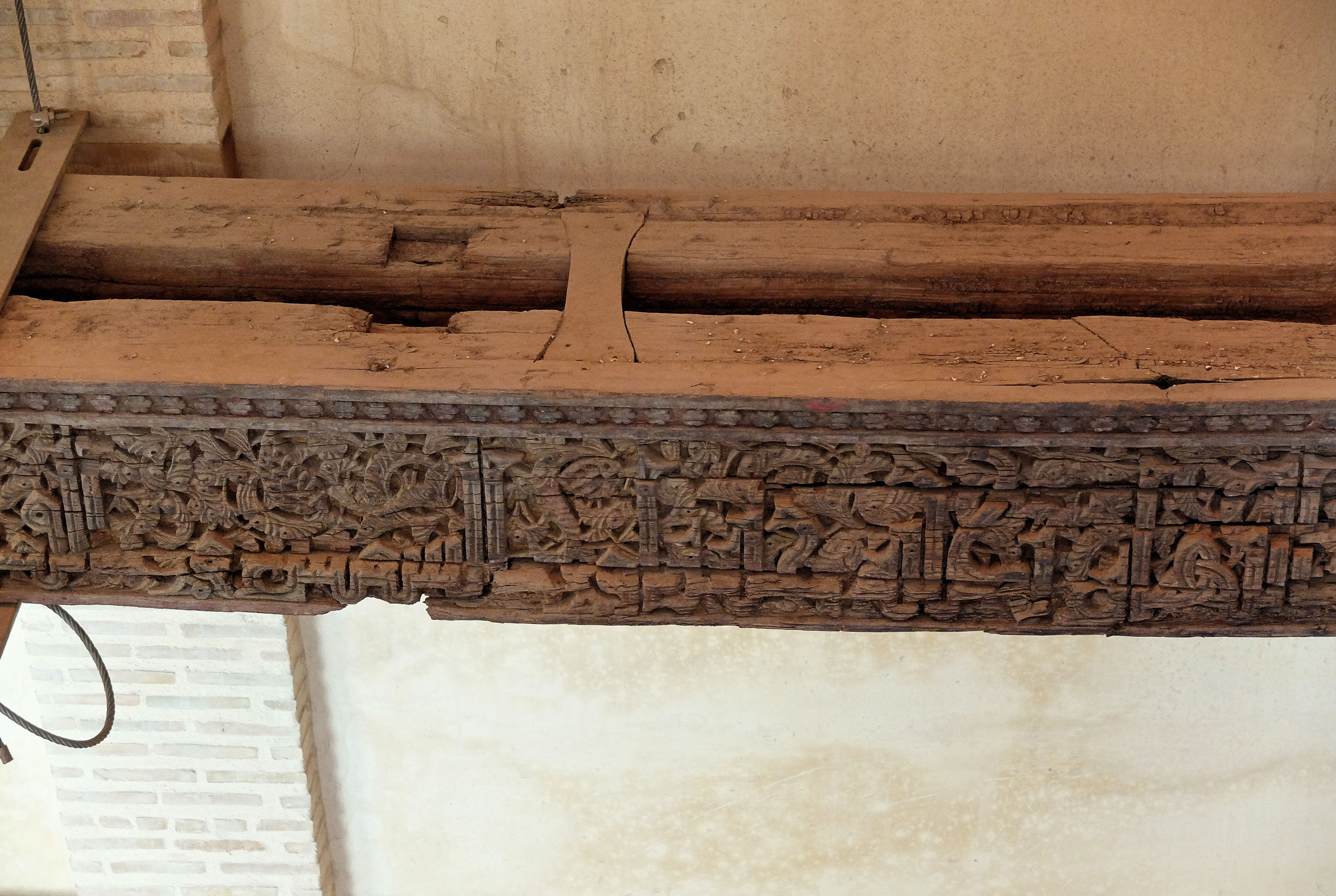
Detail of original woodwork

The building is generally dated to the 13th century, though some sources attribute its foundation to the Almoravid period (11th-12th centuries). The funduq is known to have been restored in 1290 or 1293 CE (689 or 292 AH) under the Marinid sultan Abu Ya'qub (r. 1286-1307), at which time it was endowed to the habous (waqf) of the nearby Qarawiyyin Mosque (in other words, its revenues became contributions to the funds of the mosque). Accordingly, the funduq may have existed before this restoration, as the 14th-century writer al-Jazna'i claims. This makes it among the oldest remaining funduqs in the medina, although it has undergone many heavy restorations in its history. The adjacent Funduq Sbitriyyin is less discussed in existing literature but is believed to be very old as well. One guidebook attributes it to 13th century, like its neighbour.

The Shamma'in Funduq was one of the major buildings of its kind in Fes, thanks in part to its central location near the most important commercial and religious buildings in the city (e.g. the Qarawiyyin Mosque, its nearby madrasas, and the major bazaar known as the Kissaria al-Kifah). Like a number of other funduqs, it served as a commercial center where merchants could store their goods and animals on the ground floor while the upper floors served as lodging for merchants and travelers. In the case of the Funduq Shamma'in, its ground-floor courtyard served as an auction market for olives and dried fruits while its upper floors were occupied by artisan workshops, particularly of shoemakers. It was also one of the central locations in the city where one could rent mules.

The adjacent Funduq Sbitriyyin served as an auction market for goat skins and other leather products (different products were sold in the same place but at different times of the day), which also earned it the name Funduq el-Jeld (Arabic: فندق الجلد, lit. 'inn of the skins/hides'). Its upper floors were occupied by artisans.

The Funduq Shamma'in has been seriously damaged by fires at least twice in its history, the last of which was in 1974. The only part of the building to survive relatively intact was its entrance vestibule, which preserved important examples of Marinid-period carved decoration in cedar wood and an inscription in Kufic Arabic script. Both the Funduq Shamma'in and the Funduq Sbitriyyin were most recently restored in 2016 and reopened in 2018 as centers for traditional crafts in the medina of Fes. Since the restoration, the Funduq Shamma'in's original woodwork elements are on display in the courtyard.
