= Abu Soda =

- Emir of the Zenatas
- Born: Abu Soda ibn Khalila; 11th Century; Central Maghreb
- Died: 1058; M'zab
Names
- Abu Soda ibn Khalila Al Ifreni
- Dynasty: Banu Ifran
- Father: Khalila Al-ifreni
- Religion: Islam
- Occupation: Emir; Military Commander; Vizier

Abu Soda ibn Khalila Al-Ifreni was the Emir of the Zenatas from the Banu Ifran up until his death in 1058 cause of the Banu Hilal.

== Biography ==
Abu Soda’s full name was Abu Soda ibn Khalila. He was a vizier for a certain Bakhti who was Maghrawid governor of Tlemcen. He reunited a bunch of Central Maghreb tribes under his banner to fight the Banu Hilal and the Zoghbas. Abu Soda reigned up until his death in 1058 where he was killed in battle after resisting the Banu Hilal in Mzab and Ifriqiya, and the Ifrenids then evacuated the region. He died in the M'zab province, the Banu Ifren escape into Djebel Amour and the Banu Hilal settle into the region.

O you who ask where the tomb of Khalifa the Zenatian is, do not be slow to grasp it." I see it upstream of the Zan River, and above it rises a convent of lofty construction. I see it where the lowland departs from the road leading to the sand hills; the river is to its right, and the reed wood indicates the location. Oh! How my heart suffers because of Khalifa the Zenatian, descendant of noble men! He died under the blows of the hero of battles, Diab Ibn Ghanem, and from his wounds flows blood like water from a wineskin. O you, our neighbor.

— Abu Soda,
