= Abu Nour =

Abu Nour bin Abi Qara al-Ifrani (Arabic: أبو نور بن أبي قرة اليفرني; 1014–1058) was a Berber king of the Taifa of Ronda. He built the most important sites in Ronda.

== Life ==
Abu Nour belonged to the Banu Ifran. The Banu Ifran were part of the Taifa of Malaga until the death of Yahya ibn Ali ibn Hammud al-Mu'tali. After that Abu Nour established a new kingdom, the Taifa of Ronda in 1039. Abu Nour established alliances with the surrounding tribes. When Muhammad ibn Idris al-Mahdi Balah deposed his uncle, Idris al'Ali Ballah, from the throne of the Taifa of Malaga in 1046, Abu Nour helped Idris regain the throne.

In 1053, Abbad II al-Mu'tadid invited Abu Nour along with Muhammad bin Noh al-Darimi of Morón and Abadoun bin Khazaroun of Arcos to Seville. Al-Mu'tadid killed Muhammad and Abadoun and imprisoned Abu Nour. Abu Nour's son Badis bin Abu Nour succeeded him as king of Ronda until 1057, when al-Mu'tadid released Abu Nour. Abu Nour returned to Ronda, put his son to death for misrule, and died shortly afterward, leaving the kingdom to his second son, Abu Nasr Fatouh.
