= Aziza Chaouni =

Moroccan architect

- Born: Aziza Chaouni
- Known for: Architecture

Aziza Chaouni (Arabic: عزيزة شاؤني) is a Moroccan architect who teaches at the University of Toronto.

== Detail ==
She is the founder of Aziza Chaouni Projects and associate professor at the John H. Daniels Faculty of Architecture, Landscape and Design in Toronto. She leads Designing Ecological Tourism (DET), "a collaborative research platform that investigates the challenges faced by ecotourism in the developing world."

Chaouni has a postgraduate degree from Harvard Graduate School of Design and a BSc in Civil Engineering from Columbia University. Starting in 2009 she led a project to rehabilitate the Fez River in her hometown of Fez, Morocco, as part of a larger restoration effort in the area which lasted several years and required engineering and architectural expertise. In 2014 she gave a TED talk on this project.

In 2016 she helped to renovate the oldest functioning library in the world, the library at al-Qarawiyyin University, built in 859 by Fatima Al-Fihria. She was also in charge of the restoration of Jean-François Zevaco's brutalist Sidi Harazem Bath Complex, leading a team of architects, engineers, researchers and photographers.
