= Pomaria =

Pomaria may refer to:

== Places and jurisdictions ==
- Pomaria, the Roman municipality and former bishopric in Mauretania on the site of modern Tlemcen, in Algeria, now a Latin Catholic titular see
- Pomaria, South Carolina, USA
- Pomaria (Summer–Huggins House), on the list of NRHPs in South Carolina
- Pomaria, a region of Henderson, Auckland, New Zealand

== Other ==
- Pomaria (plant), a legume genus in the Caesalpinioideae
