= Abu al-Hasan Ali al-Jaznai =

Abu al-Hassan Ali al-Jaznai (Arabic: أبو الحسن علي الجزنائي) (who lived in the 14th century) was a Moroccan historian and author of Kitab Tarikh madinat Fas, al-maruf bi-Zahrat al-as fi bina madinat Fas or simply Zahrat al-As (The Myrtle Flower), an important source on the history of Fes in Morocco and its inhabitants.

== Biography ==
Ali al-Jaznai was born into the al-Jaznai family, a well known medieval Berber family, belonging to the Zenata Igzennayen (Jeznaya) tribe.
