= Kabbaj =

Kabbaj or al-Kabbaj or el-Kabbaj is a surname. Notable people with the surname include:

- Fatima al-Kabbaj (born 1932), Moroccan religious leader
- Ikram Kabbaj (born 2004), Moroccan artist
- John Kabbaj (born 1973), English poker player
- Mohammed Kabbaj (born 1946), Moroccan politician
- Omar Kabbaj, Moroccan politician
- Nevine el-Kabbaj (born 1965), Egyptian politician
- Yasmine Kabbaj (born 2004), Moroccan tennis player
