= Fatima al-Fihriya =

Founder of the al-Qarawiyyin mosque in Fez, Morocco (c. 800–880)

- فاطمة الفهرية
- Born: c. 800 CE; Kairouan (present-day Tunisia)
- Died: c. 880 CE; Fez (present-day Morocco)
- Known for: Sponsoring construction of the Al-Qarawiyyin Mosque

Fatima bint Muhammad al-Fihriya al-Qurashiyya (Arabic: فاطمة بنت محمد الفهرية القرشية), known in shorter form as Fatima al-Fihriya or Fatima al-Fihri, was an Arab woman who is credited with founding the al-Qarawiyyin Mosque in 857–859 CE in Fez, Morocco. She is also known as Umm al-Banīn ("Mother of the Sons"). Al-Fihriya died around 880 CE. The al-Qarawiyyin Mosque subsequently developed into a teaching institution, which became the modern University of al-Qarawiyyin in 1963. Her story is told by Ibn Abi Zar' (d. between 1310 and 1320) in The Garden of Pages (Rawd al-Qirtas) as founder of the mosque. Since she was first mentioned many centuries after her death, her story has been hard to substantiate and some modern historians doubt her existence.

== Biography ==
Little is known about Fatima's personal life, except for what was recorded by 14th-century historian Ibn Abi-Zar’, which forms the basis of the traditional narrative about her.

=== Early life ===
Fatima was born in the town of Kairouan, in present-day Tunisia, possibly around 800 CE. She is said to have been the daughter of a wealthy merchant. According to Ibn Abi Zar', her father was Muhammad al-Fihri al-Qayrawani and he came to Fez as part of a larger migration of families from Kairouan during the early Idrisid period. With him were his wife, his sister, and his daughter. Ibn Abi Zar' mentions that the latter, Fatima, was also known as Umm al-Banīn ("Mother of the Two Sons"). When Muhammad al-Fihri died, his daughter Fatima inherited his wealth.

=== Founding of al-Qarawiyyin ===
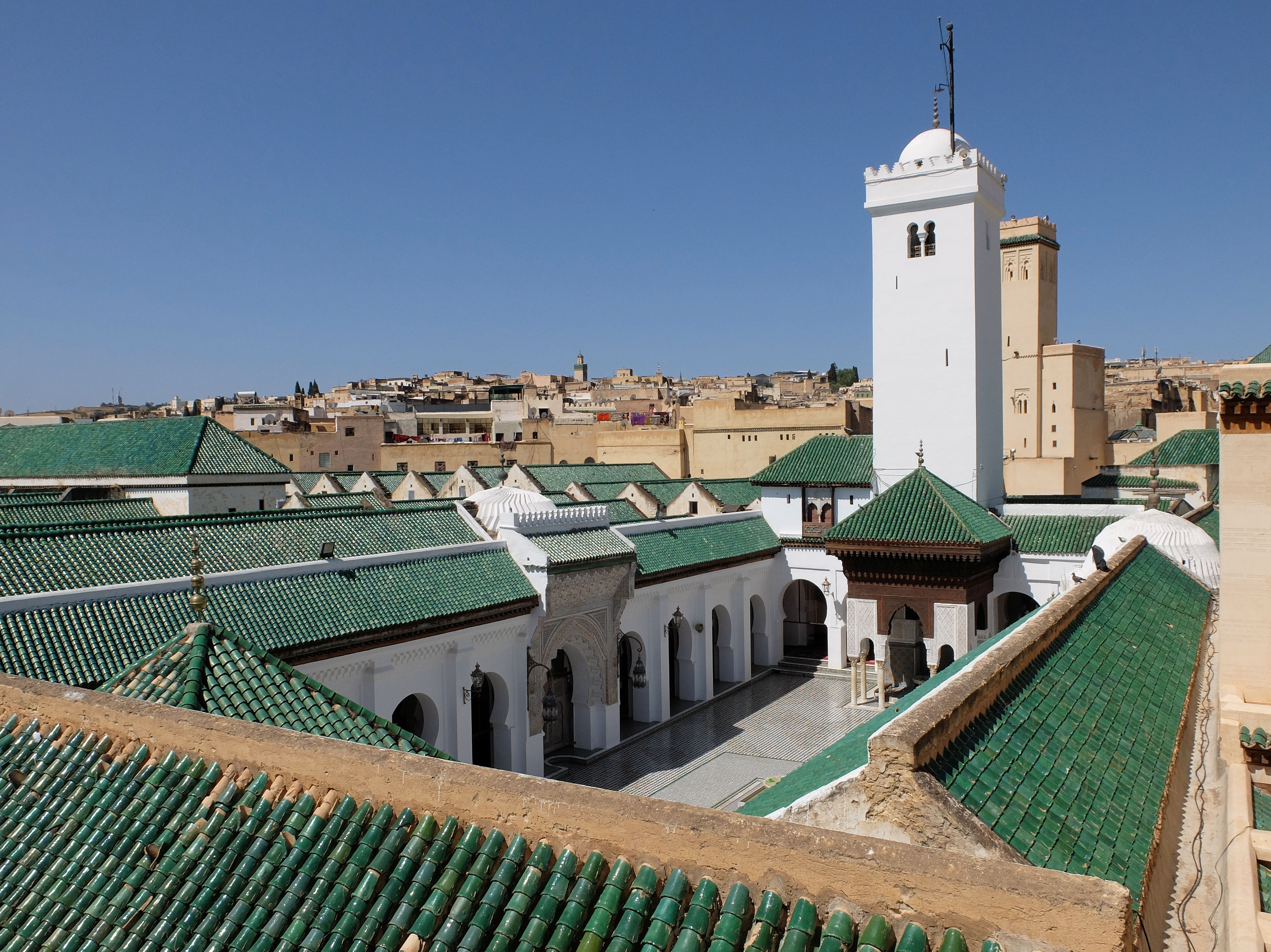
Al-Qarawiyyin Mosque and University, as it appears today

Fatima is attributed as the founder of the al-Qarawiyyin Mosque in Fez, in 857 or 859. The mosque went on to become the most important congregational mosque in Fez and one of the foremost intellectual centers in Islamic North Africa. Some scholars and UNESCO have claimed it to be the oldest continuously existing university in the world.

According to the story reported by Ibn Abi Zar', Fatima did not participate in commerce herself and wished to devote the fortune she inherited from her father to a pious act. She therefore purchased a property in the center of Fez at high cost, where she laid the foundations for the mosque on the first day of Ramadan in the year 245 of the Islamic calendar (859 CE). All the materials for the mosque are said to have been quarried on-site during construction and water was drawn from a well also dug directly on the site, so that no doubt could be cast on the legitimate origins of the resources used for the project. Fatima fasted until the project's completion, after which she went inside and prayed to God, thanking him for his blessings.

According to the same tradition, Fatima's sister, Mariam, also founded a similar mosque in the district across the river around the same time (859–60), with help from local Andalusian families, which became known as the al-Andalusiyyin Mosque (Mosque of the Andalusians).

== Historicity ==
The historicity of this story has been questioned by some modern historians who see the symmetry of two sisters founding the two most famous mosques of Fez as too convenient and likely originating from legend. Ibn Abi Zar' is also judged by contemporary historians to be a relatively unreliable source. Historian Roger Le Tourneau doubts the truth of the traditional account of Fatima building the Qarawiyyin mosque and her sister Maryam building the Andalusiyyin Mosque. He notes that the perfect parallelism of two sisters and two mosques is too good to be true, and likely a pious legend. Jonathan Bloom, a scholar of Islamic architecture, also notes the unlikelihood of the parallelisms. He states that the traditional story of the founding of the mosque belongs more to myth than to academic history and points out that no part of the mosque today is older than the tenth century.

One of the biggest challenges to the traditional story is a foundation inscription that was rediscovered during renovations to the mosque in the 20th century, previously hidden under layers of plaster for centuries. This inscription, carved onto cedar wood panels and written in a Kufic script very similar to foundation inscriptions in 9th-century Tunisia, was found on a wall above the probable site of the mosque's original mihrab (prior to the building's later expansions). The inscription, recorded and deciphered by Gaston Deverdun, proclaims the foundation of "this mosque" (Arabic: "هذا المسجد") by Dawud ibn Idris (a son of Idris II who governed this region of Morocco at the time) in Dhu al-Qadah 263 AH (July–August of 877 CE). Deverdun suggested the inscription may have come from another unidentified mosque and was moved here at a later period (probably 15th or 16th century) when the veneration of the Idrisids was resurgent in Fes and such relics would have held enough religious significance to be reused in this way. However, scholar Chafik Benchekroun argued more recently that a more likely explanation is that this inscription is the original foundation inscription of the Qarawiyyin Mosque itself and that it might have been covered up in the 12th century just before the arrival of the Almohads in the city. Based on this evidence and on the many doubts about Ibn Abi Zar's narrative, he argues that Fatima al-Fihriya is quite possibly a legendary figure rather than a historical one.

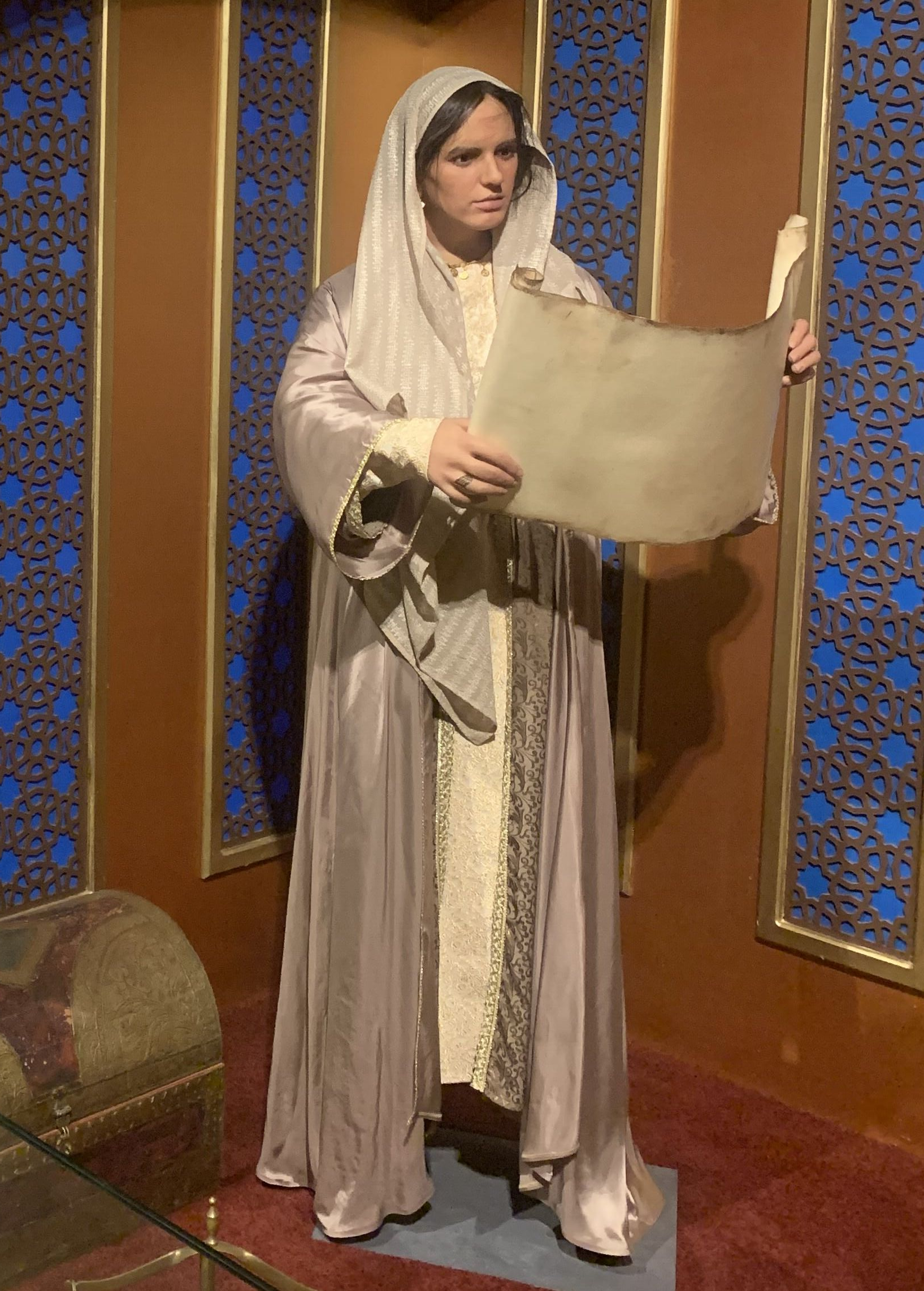
Depiction of Fatima al-Fihriya at The Jordan Museum in Amman, Jordan

According to the widely circulated narrative, the school linked with al-Qarawiyyin ultimately became the focal point of the present-day University of al-Qarawiyyin. The assertion that the university was founded by Fatima al-Fihri alongside the mosque is not clearly rooted in historical evidence. The university library, linked to Fatima's story, was restored and reopened in 2016, gaining attention from influential sources such as The Guardian, Smithsonian, TED, and Quartz that claimed that the library was the world's oldest continuously operating library, and that it was founded by Fatima herself. According to Ian D. Morris, a historian of early Islamic societies, there is no empirical evidence to support claims that Fatima founded the library. The lack of historical sources and consultation with historians by commentators, including think-tanks, NGOs, social scientists, journalists, and bloggers, has resulted in numerous "sourceless, baseless" iterations of the Fatima story. As the story is useful to present-day discourses about women and sciences in Islamic history, Morris concludes that the speculation repeated by modern writers "says more about the current value of Fatima as a political symbol than about the historical person herself."
