= Abdelhadi Tazi =

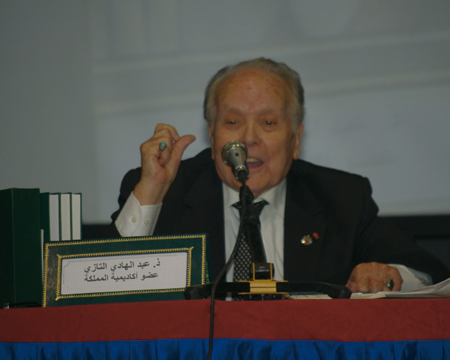
Abdelhadi Tazi

Abdelhadi Tazi (June 15, 1921 – April 2, 2015) was a scholar, writer, historian and former Moroccan ambassador in various countries.

== Early life ==
Tazi was born in Fes, Morocco, and attended primary and secondary studies in his hometown. Since his youth, he has contributed to the anti-colonial Nationalist Movement and thus experienced exile and prison.

== Biography ==
- 1947: Obtained the High degree Diploma in Theological studies from the University of Al Karaouine with "Honores".
- 1948: Teacher in the same university.
- 1953: Graduated from Moroccan Institute of High Studies.
- 1957: After Independence, he was appointed at Rabat, as Director of the Cultural Section in the Ministry of national Education.
- 1963: Obtained the Diploma of High Studies in History from the Mohammed V University with distinction "Excellent".
- 1966: English certificate from the language Institute of Baghdad.
- 1971: Obtained a PhD in History from the University of Alexandria with "Honores".

Since his youth (1935) he has published numerous articles and essays (more than 600) and translated many works and studies from English and French into Arabic.

1963/1967: Ambassador of the Kingdom of Morocco in Iraq republic
1967/1968: Ambassador of the Kingdom of Morocco in Libya
1968/1972: Back to Baghdad as an ambassador, he also achieved diplomatic missions within the Persian Gulf
1973: Director of the Institute for Scientific Research.
1979: Ambassador in the Islamic Republic of Iran, then in charge of mission at the Royal Cabinet of the Kingdom of Morocco.
1990: Chairman and Founder of the Moroccan Diplomatic Club.
1992: Chairman of the sixth International Conference of Geographical Names Standardization.
one of his important work is the travels of Ibn battuta Rihla (Arabic: تحفة النظار في غرائب الأمصار وعجائب الأسفار Tuḥfat An-Naẓār Fī Gharā'ib Al-Amṣār Wa ʻAjā'ib Al-Asfār - simply referred to as The Rihla الرحلة or "The Journey") is a medieval book which recounts the journey of the 14th-century Moroccan scholar and traveler Ibn Battuta.

Professor and lecturer in several Institutes, High Schools and Universities in Morocco and around the world about international relations, civilization and history.

Has participated to many conferences and congress (cultural, social and political), including summit conferences.

== Member ==
- Irakian Scientific Academy since 1966,
- Arabic Language Academy in Cairo 1976,
- Arab-Argentina Institute 1978,
- Ahl Albayt Academy and of the Arabic Language Academy of Jordan 1980,
- Constitution Committee of the Kingdom of Morocco Academy and member of this Academy since 1980,
- Arabic Language Academy of Damas since 1986
- Institute of the Islamic Heritage, London since 1991,
- Egyptian Science Academy, 1996

and of many other regional and international associations

== Decorations ==
• Throne Wissam (Morocco 1963).
• El Hamala Al Kobra (Libya 1968).
• Wissam Arrafidaine (Irak 1972).
• The Intellectual first Class Merit Medal (Morocco 1976)
• The Gold Medal of the Academy of the Kingdom of Morocco (1992).

== List of works ==
Here there are some of the author's works:

- Sourate Annour, explanation
- Literature of "Lamyat al Arab"
- 11 centuries History of the Qaraouiyn (in 3 languages): Fes Weddings
- Annotation of the Ibn Sahib Assalat's book on the Almohades
- A glimpse on diplomatic history of Morocco
- Moroccan-American relations history (in English)
  - Translation of "If I see three days" from Helen Keller
  - Al Qaraouiyn University History (3 volumes)
- Libya, through the Journey of Ishaqui
- The "Badia Palace", world wonder
  - In the shadow of faith
- Sicilia after Ambassador Ibn Othman memories
- Education in Arab countries (in 3 languages)
- Official Moroccan Letters - first part

Moroccan-Iranian relations

- Falcon Hunting between the Machrek and the Maghreb
- French protectora : beginning and end

Moroccan 'Waqfs' in Jerusalem
Annotations of the manuscript of Ibn Abo Al Ojals on Jews in Yemen
History of the relations between Morocco and Oman
In order to defend the territorial integrity (a trip with Prince Sidi Mohamed in his first political mission in Africa)
Secret codes in Moroccan correspondences
Annotations of the manuscript 'Al Farid' of Abi Al Kassim Al Figuigui (Sata Chasu au Fourcens)

Iran between yesterday and today
Summary of the history of Moroccan international relations (3 languages)

Al Maghraoui and his pedagogic thinkings
Moroccan diplomatic history (12 volumes)

Moroccan diplomatic history as a comic
Women through the west Muslim history
Annotations of the manuscript "Al Mazaa al latif" d'Ibn Zaydan
Ibnou Majid and Portugal
Annotations of "Ibn Batouta Journey" (5 volumes)
Jerusalem and Hebron according to Moroccan travellers

Taha Hussein in Morocco
Annotation of the transcript 'Attorthorth' of Choyouti
The Prophet's medicine between the Machriek and the Maghreb
Moroccan International History (3 volumes)

=== Coming soon ===
- A journey to Hijaz
- Moroccan Diplomatic History (3 volumes)
- Annotations of a manuscript about the Moroccan movement for slavery abolition in Morocco
  - Annotation of the manuscript concerning the journey of Ibn Othman to Malta and Napoli
- Summarised geographical lexique of Morocco
- Personal memories, started June 15, 2000

== Death ==
Tazi died in Rabat, Morocco, aged 94.
