= Fatima al-Kabbaj =

Moroccan religious leader

- Born: 1932 (age 93–94)
- Education: University of al-Qarawiyyin
- Known for: One of the first female students admitted to al-Qarawiyyin University

Fatima al-Kabbaj (Arabic: فاطمة القباج) was one of the first female students to attend the University of al-Qarawiyyin. She later became the sole female member of the Moroccan Supreme Council of Religious Knowledge.

== Education ==
Fatima al-Kabbaj began her education at Dar al-Faqiha, a traditional Moroccan Islamic school for girls, where she learnt Quran. Then, she moved to Madrasa al-Najah for her elementary studies. After finishing her studies, al-Kabbaj and her family realized that there were limited opportunities for higher studies for women. After several discussions and debates about the introduction of women to the University of al-Qarawiyyin, al-Kabbaj was admitted to the university along with nine other female students. She stayed there for 10 years and graduated in the mid-1950s.

She would later provide education in sharia to the king and his family. She argued that women were often better able to engage the illiterate and poor than the state-appointed imams.

Her experience was said to "challenge assumptions about Moroccan women’s historical access to religious authority and their mobility within the male-dominated field of Islamic scholarship."
