= Abu Bakr al-Alami al-Idrissi =

Sayyid Abu Bakr ibn Ali al-Alami (Arabic: أبو بكر بن علي العلمي; died in the 10th-century AD) is the great grandfather from whom all the Alami Sayyids of Morocco descend and the leader of the Beni Arrous tribe. He is the son of Ali son of Abu Hurma son of Isa son of Salam al-Arouss (Salam with stress on L is an ancient Berber pronunciation of Sulayman or Solomon) son of Ahmad Mizwar son of Ali Haydara son of Muhammad son of Idris II son of Idris I son of Abdullah al-Kamil son of Hasan al-Muthanna son of Hasan ibn Ali son of Ali ibn Abu Talib and Fatimah al-Zahraa, daughter of Islamic prophet Muhammad. Abu Bakr was a religious leader.

== Family Tree ==
1. Muhammad
2. Ali ibn Abu Talib
3. Hasan ibn Ali
4. Hasan al-Muthanna
5. Abdullah al-Kamil
6. Idris I
7. Idris II
8. Muhammad
9. Ali Haydara
10. Ahmad Mizwar
11. Salam al-Arouss
12. Isa
13. Abu Hurma
14. Ali
15. Abu Bakr al-Alami al-Idrissi

== His tomb ==
The Tomb of Abu Bakr is in a desolate forest called the Dak forest in Northern Morocco not far from a village called Ayn al-Hadeed in the Larache Province.

== Persecution ==
As Sayyids in Morocco suffered from the persecution by the Miknasa of Fez, as narrated by the judge Muhamad Bin Ali Hashlaf Al-Jazairi; Abu Bakr and all families that descend from Ali ibn Abu Talib sought refuge in mountains like Jabal al-Alam and were far to reach and therefore did not get their share properly in Moroccan history in terms of exactitudes of their timelines.

== Descendants ==
- He is the grandfather of Abd al-Salam ibn Mashish ibn Abu Bakr al-Alami
- His descendants are the ancient fessi Yemlahi Alami family from Fes, Morocco. Some of them left fes and live in Tangier currently.

== Notes and references ==
Muhamad Bin Ali Hashlaf Al-Jazaeri in his book Silsilat Al Usul fi Sirat Abna al-Rasool First Edition 1352 Hijri
