= Cherratine Madrasa =

Historic madrasa in Fez, Morocco

- مدرسة الشراطين
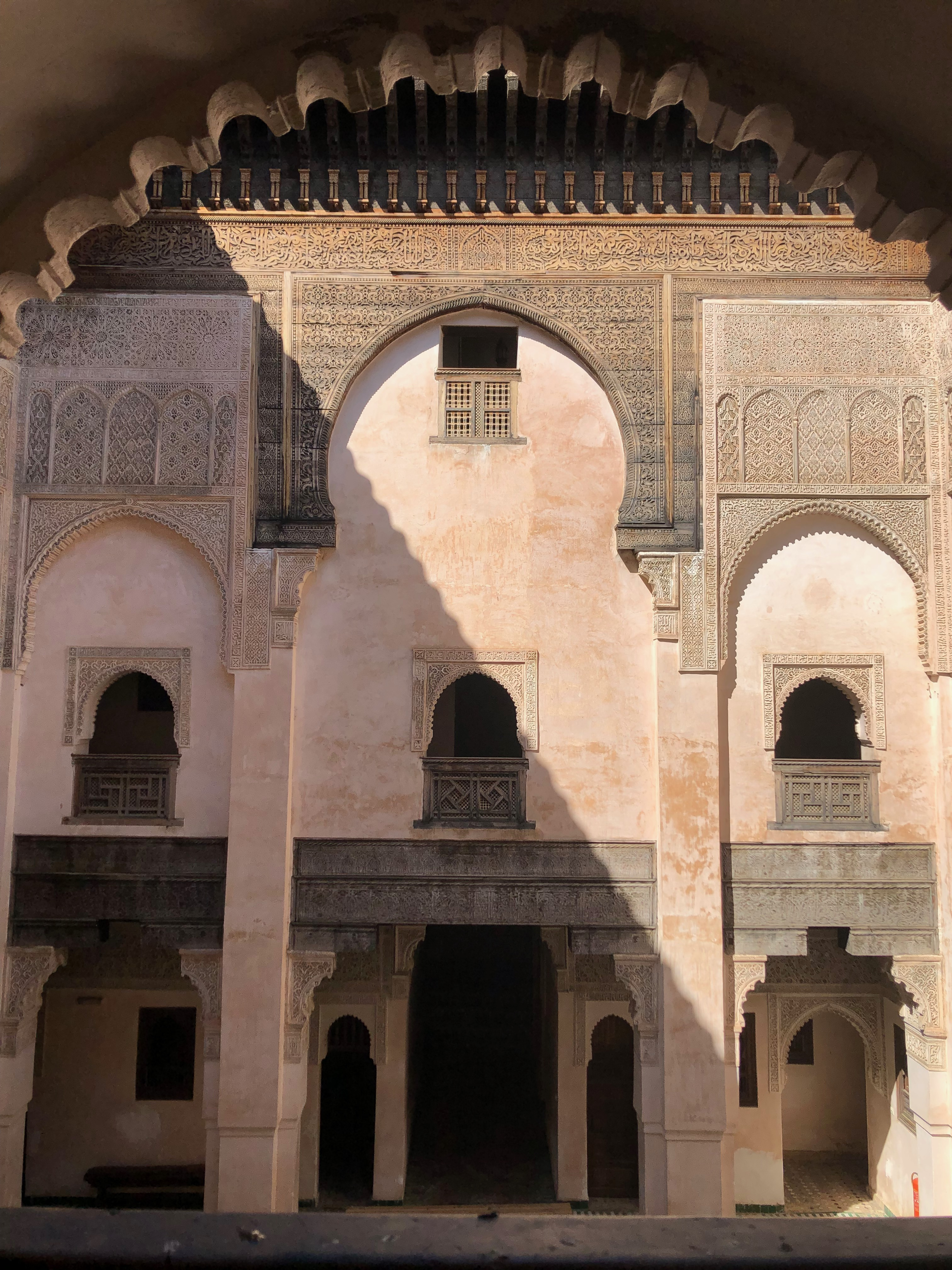
- Main courtyard of the madrasa
- Interactive map of the Cherratine Madrasa area
- Alternative names: Er-Rachidia Madrasa

General information
- Status: historic site, tourist attraction
- Type: madrasa
- Architectural style: Moroccan, Moorish
- Location: Fes, Morocco
- Coordinates: 34°03′50.5″N 4°58′26″W
- Named for: Sultan Al-Rashid
- Construction started: 17 December 1670

Technical details
- Material: cedar wood, brick, stucco, tile

Cherratine Madrasa (Arabic: مدرسة الشراطين, romanized: Madrasat esh-Sherātīn, lit. 'school of the rope makers') is a madrasa in Fez, Morocco. It is also known as the Er-Rachidia Madrasa or Ras al-Cherratine Madrasa. It was built in 1670 by the Alawi sultan Moulay al-Rashid.

== History ==
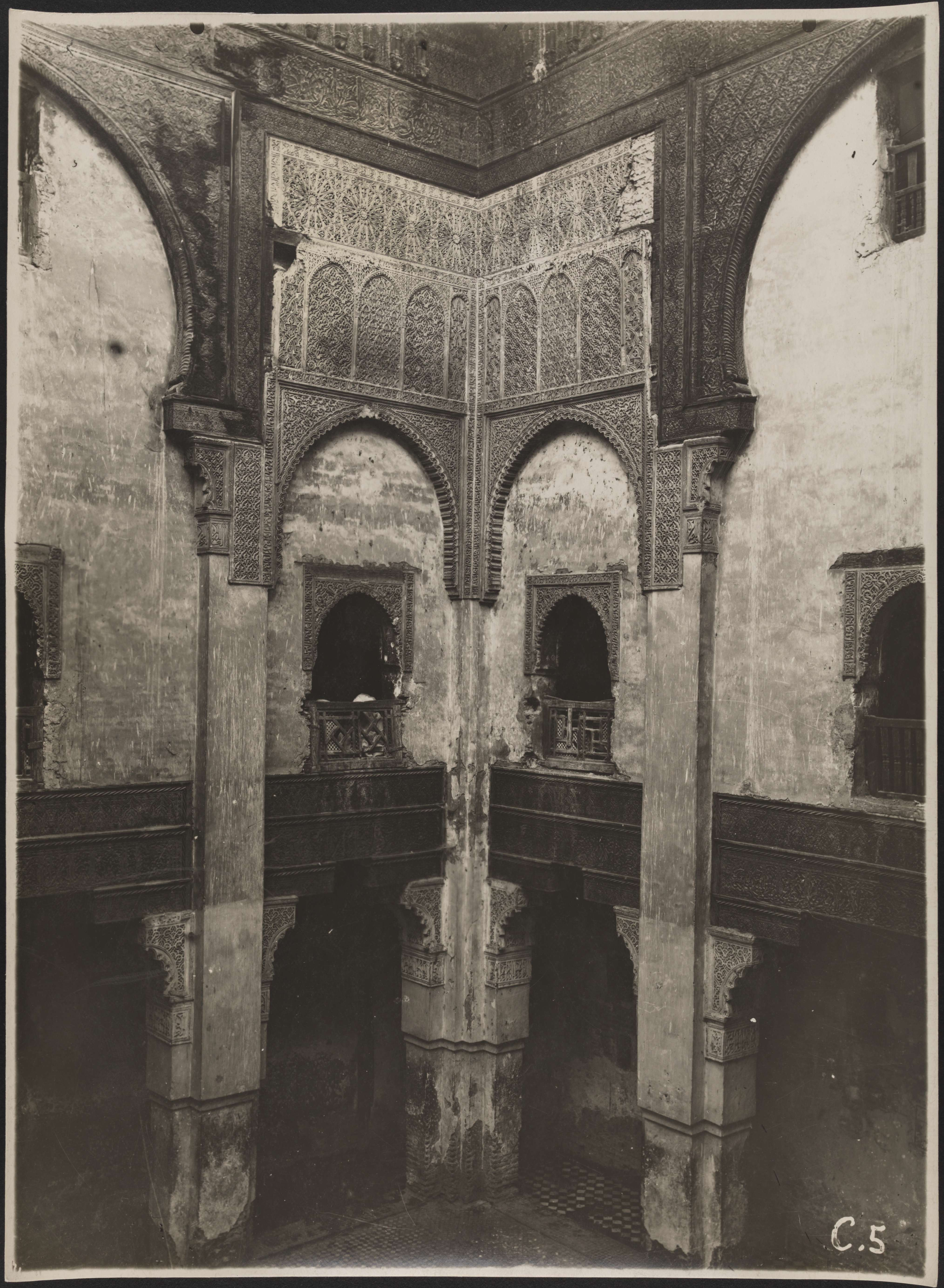
Cherratine Madrasa in the early 20th century

Construction of the madrasa began on 17 December 1670 CE (1 Sha'ban 1081 AH) under the reign of the Alawi sultan Moulay al-Rashid. The newly built madrasa replaced an older one, known as the Madrasa el-Lebbadin or Madrasa el-Ebridin, of unclear origin, which according to traditional sources was demolished because it had been desecrated by raucous students. This reconstruction on the site of a former madrasa may explain why the current madrasa was able to be built on a regular rectangular floor plan despite being located at the heart of the already densely-built old city. The name Cherratine (esh-Sherātīn), meaning "rope-makers", referred to the presence of a nearby market where rope-makers were established.

Like other madrasas in the city, it was used to host students and teachers from outside the city who came to study or work at the nearby University of al-Qarawiyyin. By the 19th century or early 20th century the madrasa, the largest of the madrasas in its neighbourhood, was mostly dedicated to housing students from Algeria, the Rif region, the Tafilalt, and other eastern regions.

The madrasa has been classified as historic heritage monument in Morocco since 1917.

== Architecture ==
The building is built in brick and cedar wood. The madrasa is entered via a decorated doorway, from which a corridor leads to a main central courtyard, roughly square in plan. At the center of the courtyard is a fountain with a marble bowl. The courtyard is surrounded on four sides by a gallery or portico consisting of one large bay flanked by two small ones. On three of these sides, the space above is marked by three windows which are framed by large blind arches (the central arch being again larger and taller than the other two). On the southeast side, however, the portico consists of three horeshoe arches which lead directly to a rectangular prayer hall, wider than it is deep, with a central mihrab (wall niche symbolizing the direction of prayer) decorated with carved stucco. The madrasa is notable for its large size but the building is sparsely decorated in comparison with older Marinid madrasas in the city (e.g. the nearby Al-Attarine Madrasa or the larger Bou Inania Madrasa to the west). Nonetheless, the wooden lintels and the stucco corbels of the galleries in the courtyard are carved with arabesque motifs, as are the upper zones of the courtyard walls (above the blind arches) which are covered with wood and stucco.

Around the courtyard, on the two upper floors, is a large array of small student dorm rooms which could house between 130 and 150 students in its time. This area includes several small inner courtyards with multi-story galleries from which some of student rooms are accessed and which also feature some restrained stucco and wooden decoration. This arrangement is again unlike the layout of older Marinid madrasas in Fez but is similar, however, to the arrangement seen in the Saadian-built 16th-century Ben Youssef Madrasa in Marrakesh.

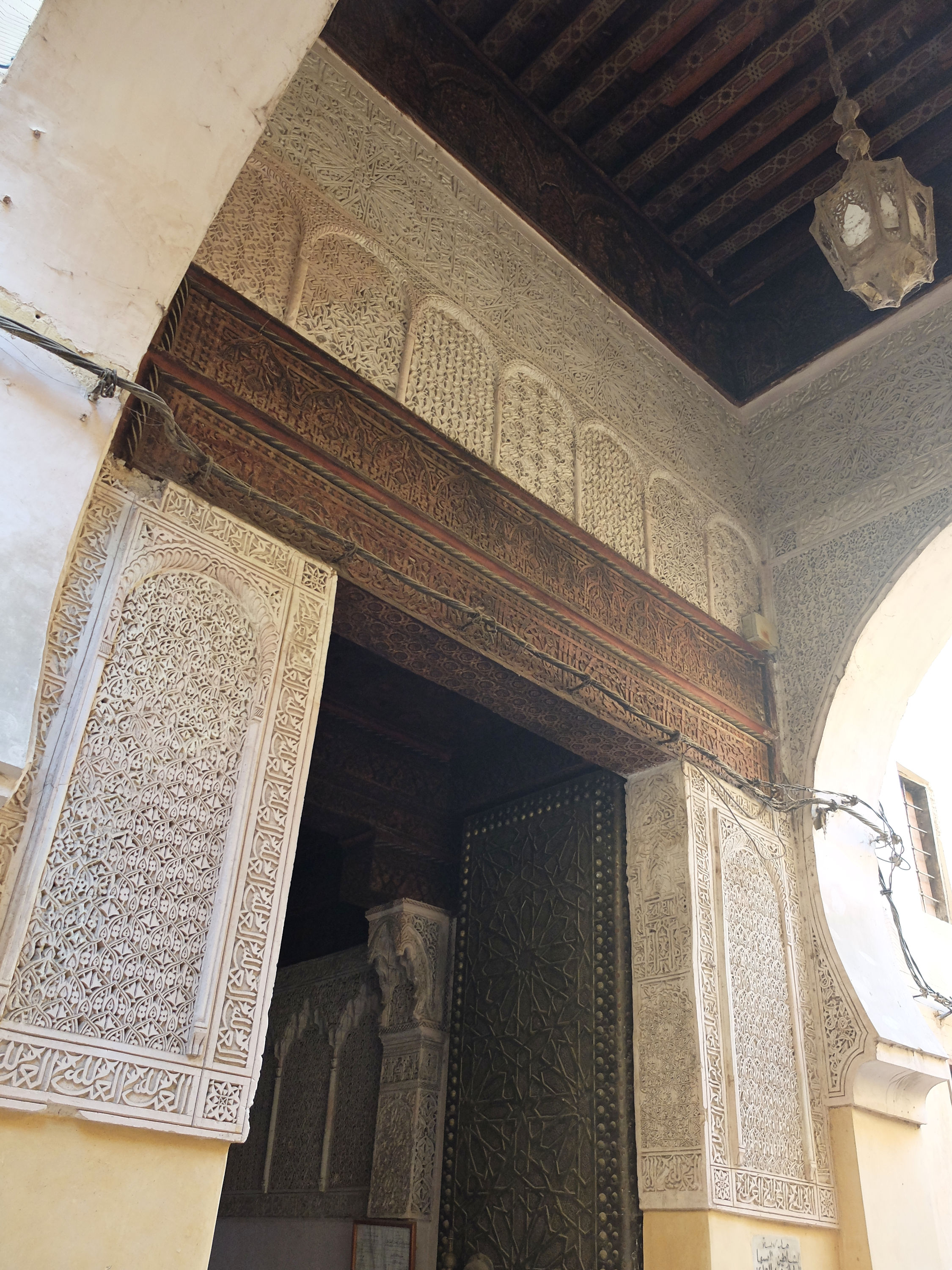
Entrance to the madrasa

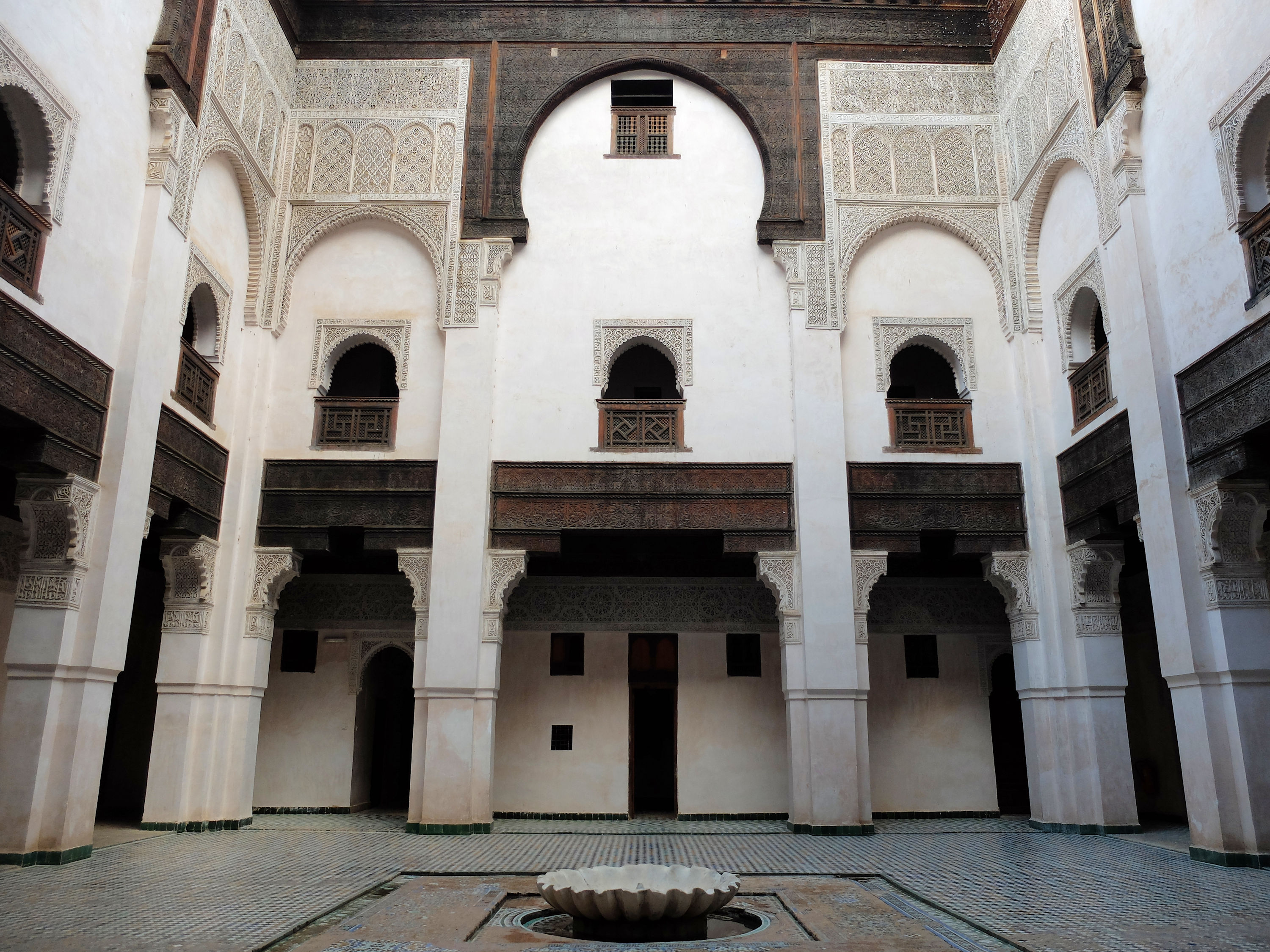
Main courtyard

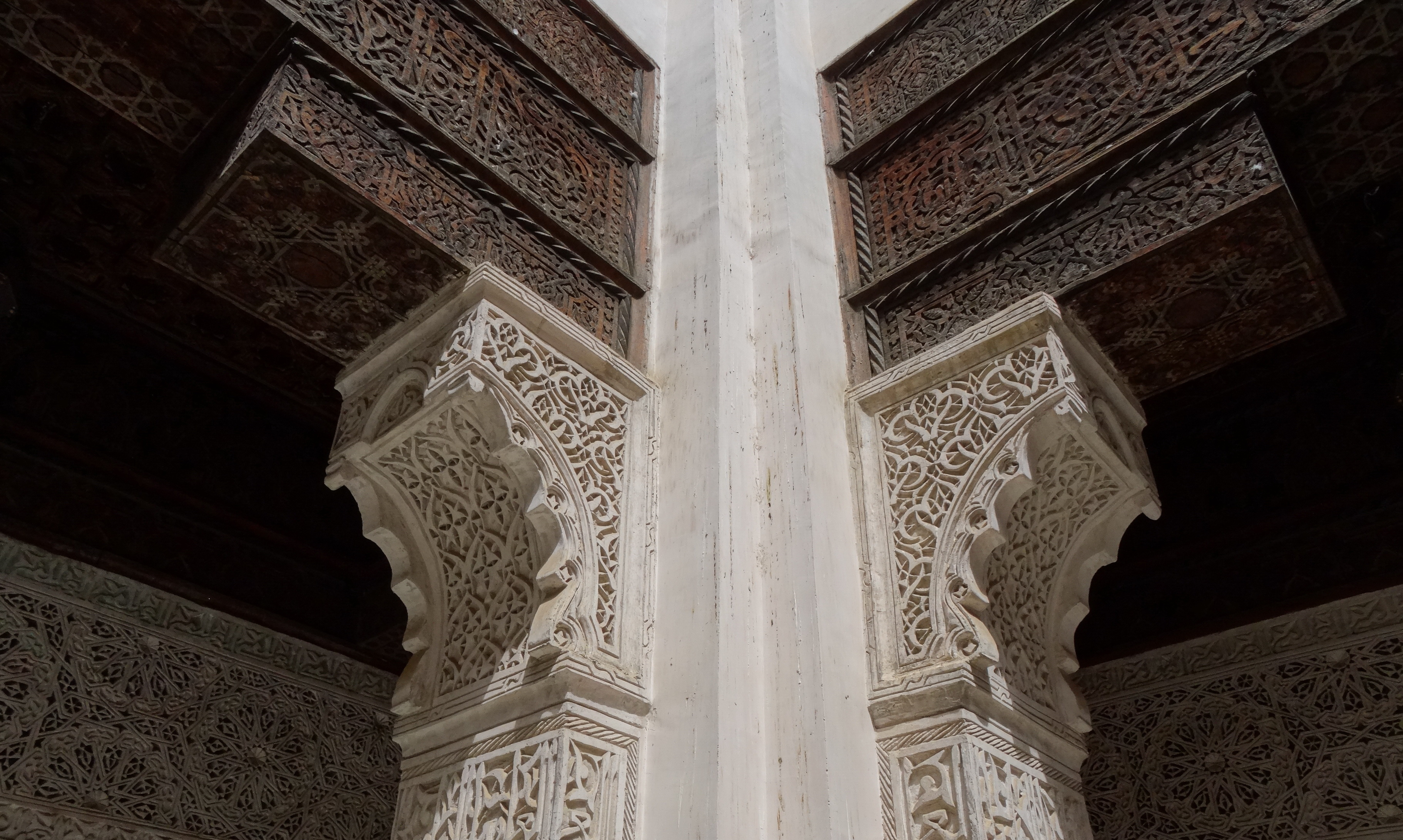
Details of carved decoration in the main courtyard

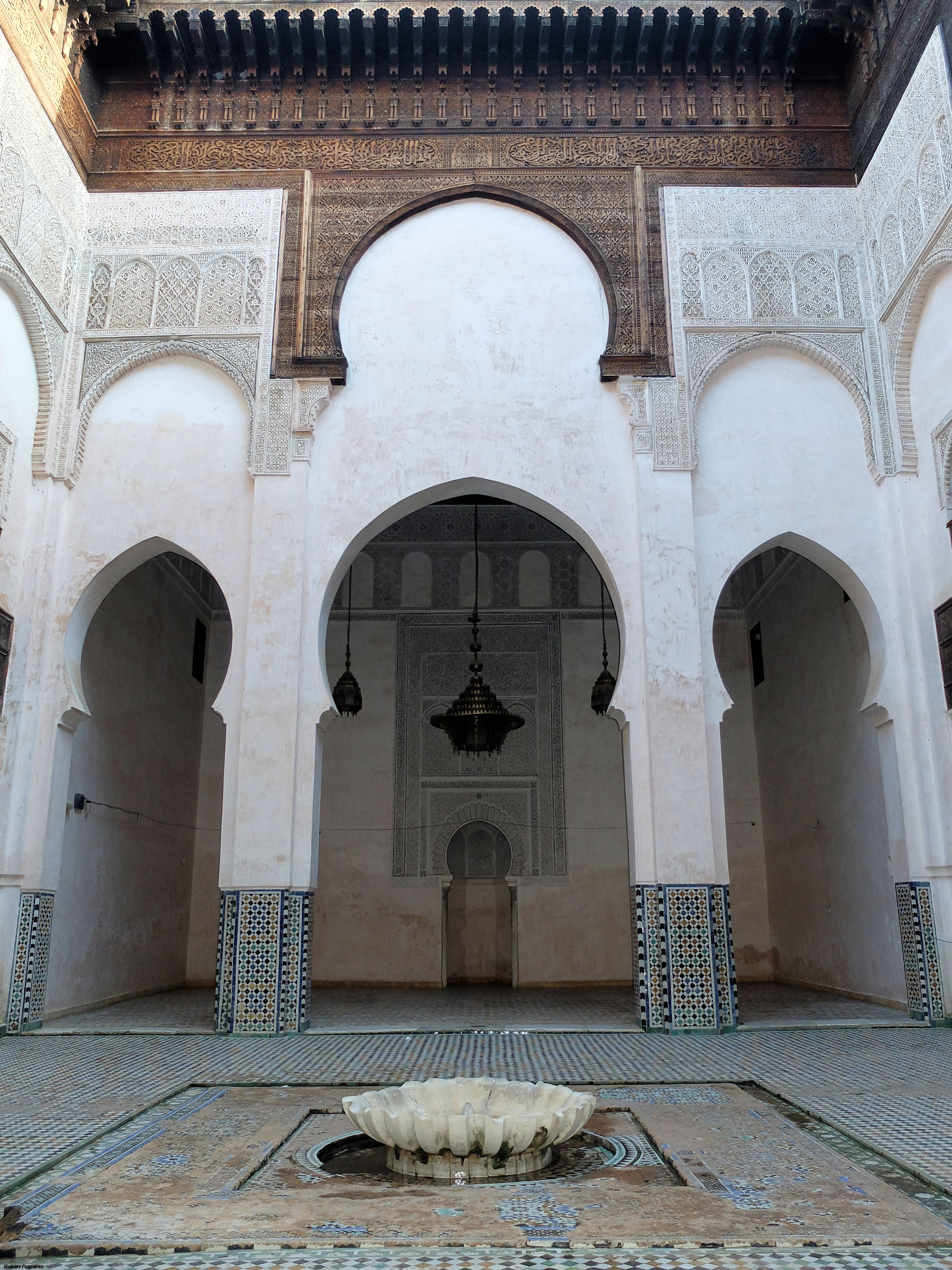
Main courtyard, looking southeast towards the mihrab of the prayer hall

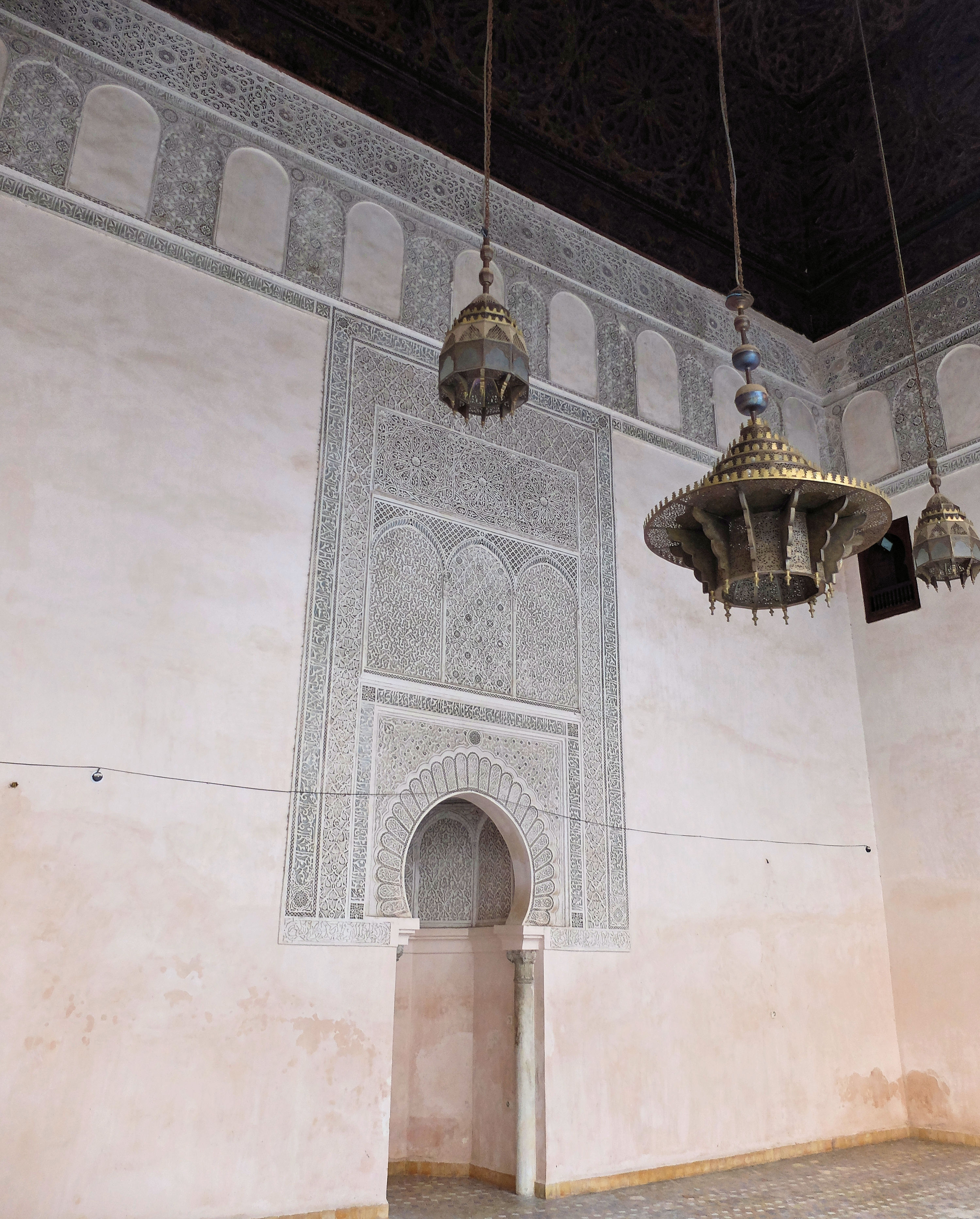
Mihrab of the prayer hall

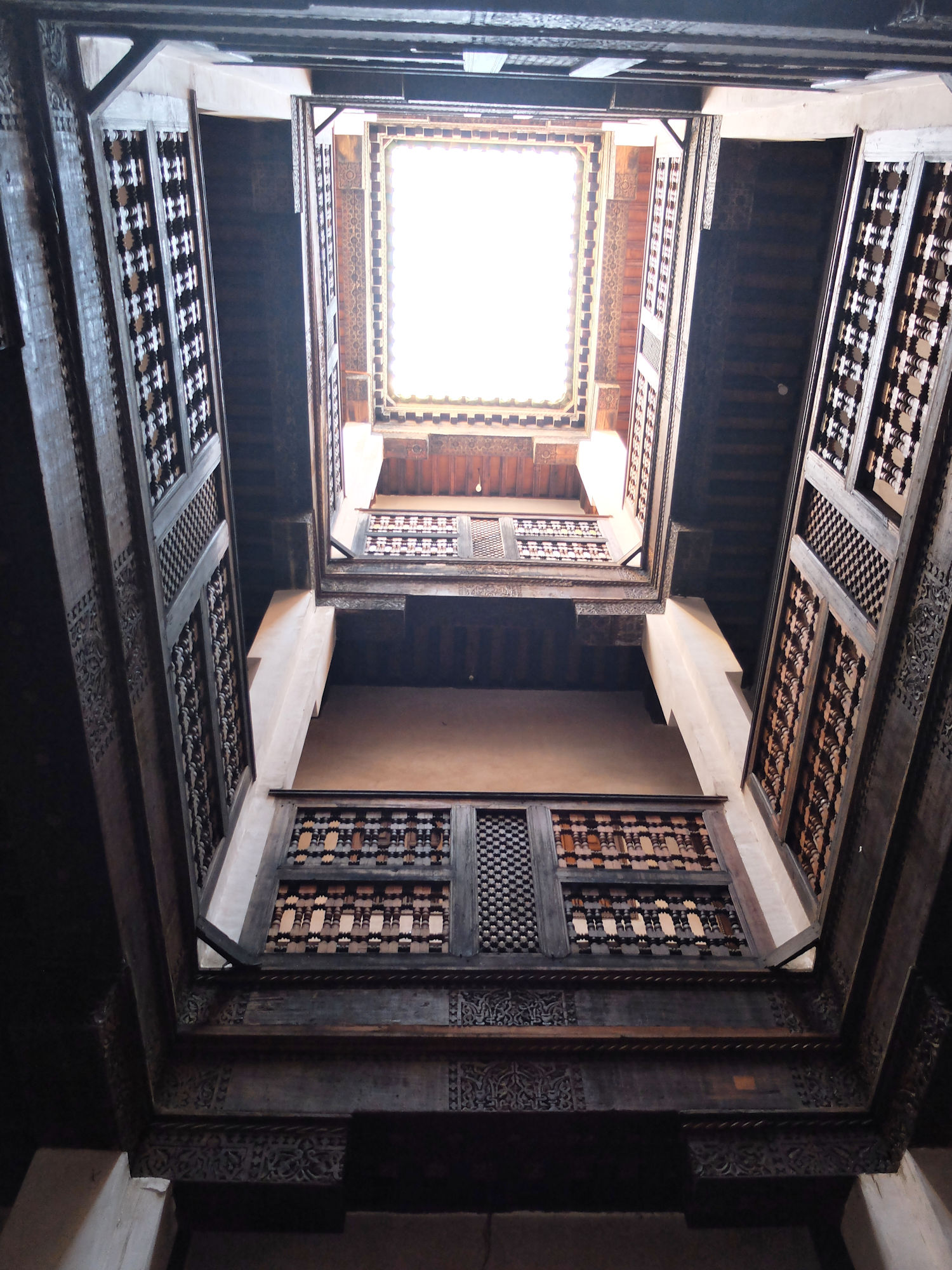
One of the smaller secondary courtyards serving the student dormitories

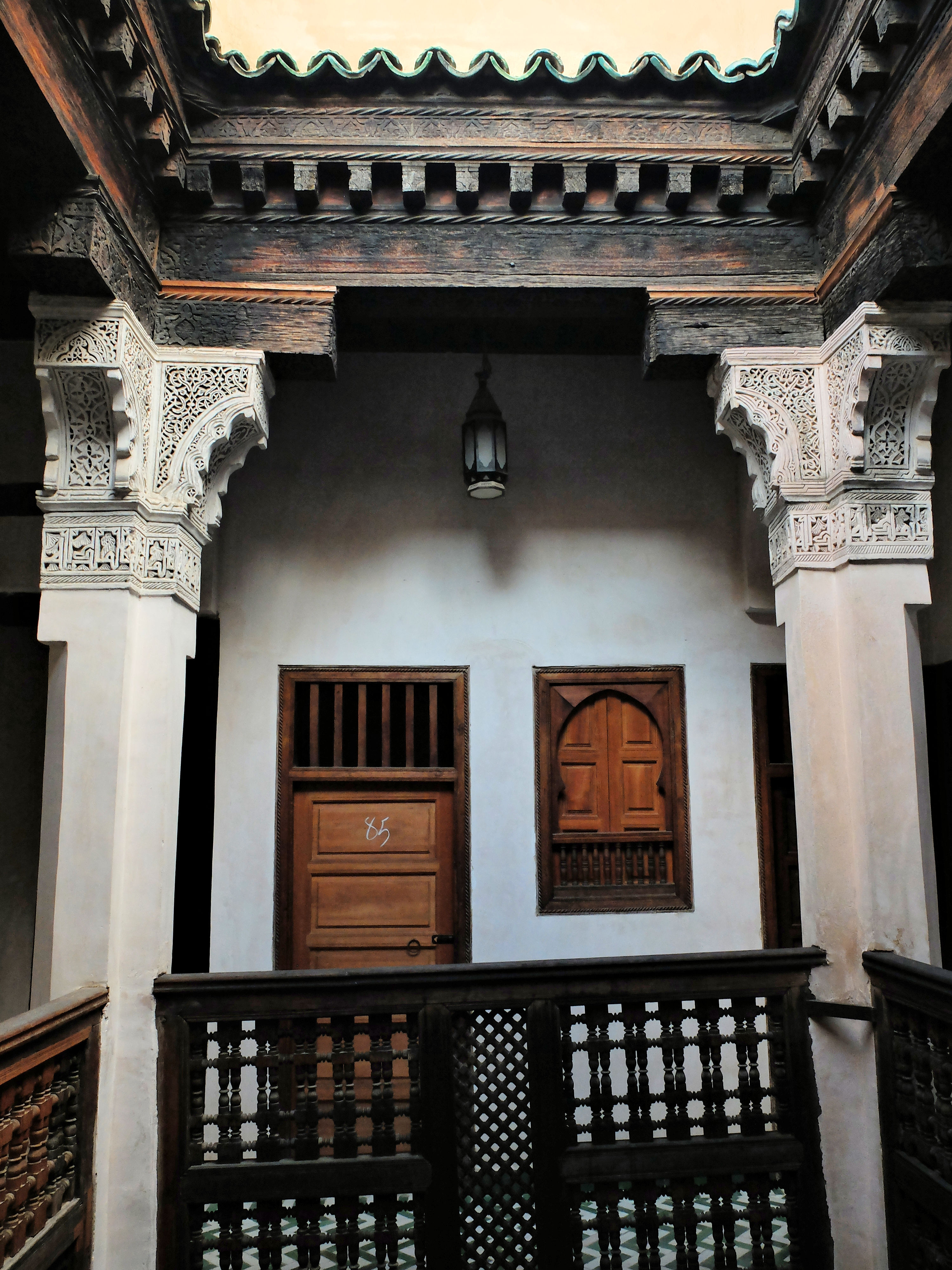
One of the smaller secondary courtyards serving the student dormitories
