= Sba'iyyin Madrasa =

Madrasa as-Sba'iyyin
- مدرسة السباعيين
- Interactive map of the Madrasa as-Sba'iyyin area
- Former names: Madrasa al-Sughra

General information
- Type: madrasa
- Architectural style: Moorish (Marinid)
- Location: Fes, Morocco
- Coordinates: 34°03′46.5″N 4°58′6.4″W
- Construction started: 1323 CE

Technical details
- Material: cedar wood, brick, stucco, tile
- Floor count: 2
- Grounds: 183 square metres

The Sba'iyyin Madrasa or Madrasa as-Sba'iyyin (Arabic: مدرسة السباعيين; also transliterated as Sbaiyin or Sebaaiyyine) is a historic madrasa in the medina of Fez, Morocco. It is located in the Andalous quarter of Fes el-Bali, next to the Mosque of the Andalusians. It was founded in 1323 by Sultan Abu al-Hasan and adjoins the larger Sahrij Madrasa, which was founded just before it. Together, the two madrasas served to teach and lodge students in the vicinity of the main mosque.

== History ==
=== Historical background ===
The madrasa was built during the Marinid era, when many of Fez's historic madrasas were built. It was commissioned in 1323 by Abu al-Hassan, who later became sultan but at that time was only a prince and heir apparent to his father, Sultan Abu Sa'id Uthman II. The madrasa was initially known as Madrasa al-Sughra (the "Lesser/Smaller Madrasa") because it was built as a complement to the larger Madrasa al-Kubra ("Greater Madrasa"), later known as the Madrasa as-Sahrij. It eventually came to be known as the Madrasa as-Sba'iyyin (roughly: "Madrasa of those who teach the Seven Recitations of the Qur'an") presumably due to the madrasa's specialization in teaching the seven canonical methods of reciting the Qur'an. Together, the Madrasa as-Sahrij and the Madrasa as-Sba'iyyin provided both lodging and teaching for students studying at the nearby Andalus Mosque, much as the Seffarine and al-Attarine Madrasas served students at the al-Qarawiyyin Mosque across the river. The madrasas were also accompanied by another funduq or hospice, but this has since disappeared.

=== Recent damage and restoration ===
The madrasa may likely have been restored multiple times along with its neighbouring counterpart, the Sahrij Madrasa. However, both madrasas eventually fell into neglect in recent decades. There were initial efforts to repair and protect them in the 2000s, including from the World Monuments Fund, but they then suffered from further vandalism. In particular, serious damage was done to the Sba'iyyin Madrasa in 2009 when looters removed two carved wooden beams and some of the marble columns that held up the gallery balcony, causing the second floor of the gallery to collapse. The two madrasas were more recently repaired and restored by the local heritage agency ADER-Fès and reopened in 2017, as part of a wider program of rehabilitation for Fes el-Bali which started in 2013.

== Architecture ==
The madrasa is contemporary to the neighbouring Sahrij Madrasa but is smaller and less extensively decorated than the latter. It covers an area of 183 square metres. It is entered from the street via a bent passage, but it was also apparently connected to the other madrasa via another interior passage. Inside, it consists of small courtyard with a small central fountain and surrounded by a two-story gallery supported by marble columns and brick pillars. The ceiling above the columns is supported by wooden beam lintels which are carved with arch-like and arabesque motifs as well as Arabic inscriptions. Both levels of the gallery give access to the student accommodations, a total of 23 sleeping rooms plus 3 office rooms. On the ground floor, at the far end of the courtyard and across from the entrance, is a small prayer hall which is undecorated (or has lost its former decoration) and has a simple mihrab.

== See also ==
- Bou Inania Madrasa
- Madrasa of Abu al-Hassan (in Salé)
