= Hammam Saffarin =

Historic building in Fez, Morocco

Coordinates: 34°03′50.6″N 4°58′22.4″W

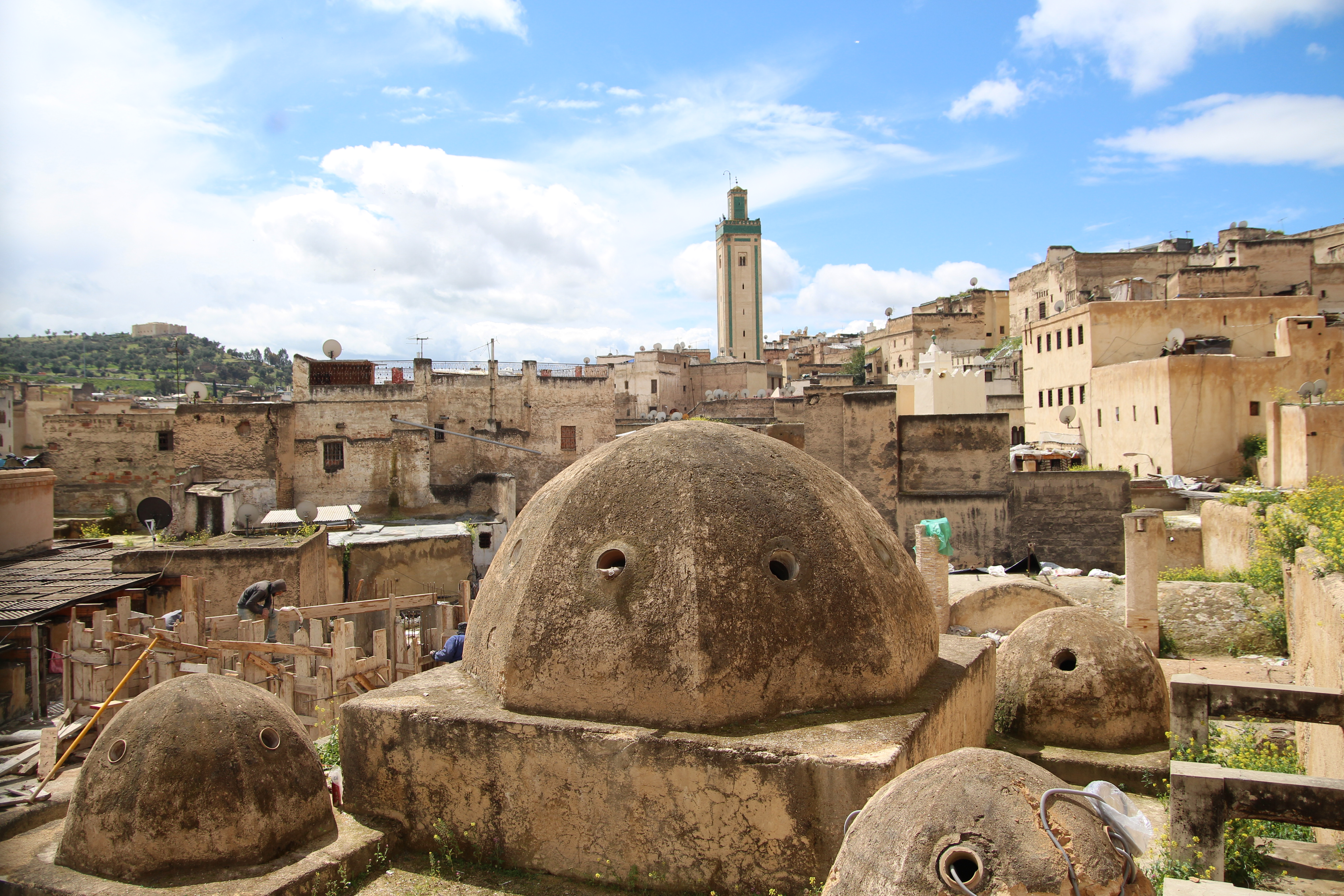
Rooftop view of the domes (over the undressing room) of the Saffarin Hammam

The Hammam Saffarin (Arabic: حمام الصفارين, romanized: Hammam as-Saffarin; also rendered in English as Saffarin Hammam, Hammam Seffarine, etc.) is a historic hammam (bathhouse) in the medina (old city) of Fez, Morocco. It is located on the southwest side of Place Seffarine, across from the Madrasa Saffarin and south of the Qarawiyyin Mosque.

== History ==
The hammam dates back to the 14th century during the Marinid period. It was probably originally intended to cater to the local coppersmiths who worked in the boutiques and workshops around Place Seffarine. It is one of many hammams which have survived in the city, thanks in part to the continued popularity of the hammam in Moroccan culture over the centuries and to the present day.

Local inhabitants associate this hammam with the tombs of two Sufi Muslim saints, Sidi Tallouk and Sidi Ahmad Skalli, although no physical tombs are visible and the exact relation between the hammam and the saints is not clearly established. Nonetheless, the baraka (blessings) of the saints are often believed to contribute to the purification that can be achieved at the hammam. This popular or mystical association with certain Muslim saints characterizes many hammams in Fez.

The hammam has generally preserved its traditional layout. It was recently underwent restoration under the supervision of architect Rachid Halaoui, as part of an Austrian-led project to restore various historic hammams across the Mediterranean region.

== Social function ==
The Saffarin Hammam and other hammams in traditional Moroccan urban centers plays an important social and spiritual role. They allowed for the local population, especially the poorer inhabitants, to perform ablutions as well as maintaining general health and cleanliness. Even today, it is still serves as an economically accessible facility for poorer urban residents. The hammam was also involved in other cleanliness rituals and traditions associated with weddings, childbirths, and circumcision. Newlyweds come to the hammam for washing and prayer and have a special corner reserved for them where they light candles. Women who have given birth also come to the hammam to receive a special massage.

Accordingly, hammams were also important spaces for women as they were one of the few public institutions that provided them with a female-only space outside the home. (Most hammams had separate hours of operation for men and women, while the Saffarin hammam was one of the few to have separate facilities for both.) Women have thus also been instrumental in passing down many of the social traditions associated with the hammam.

== Architecture and operation ==
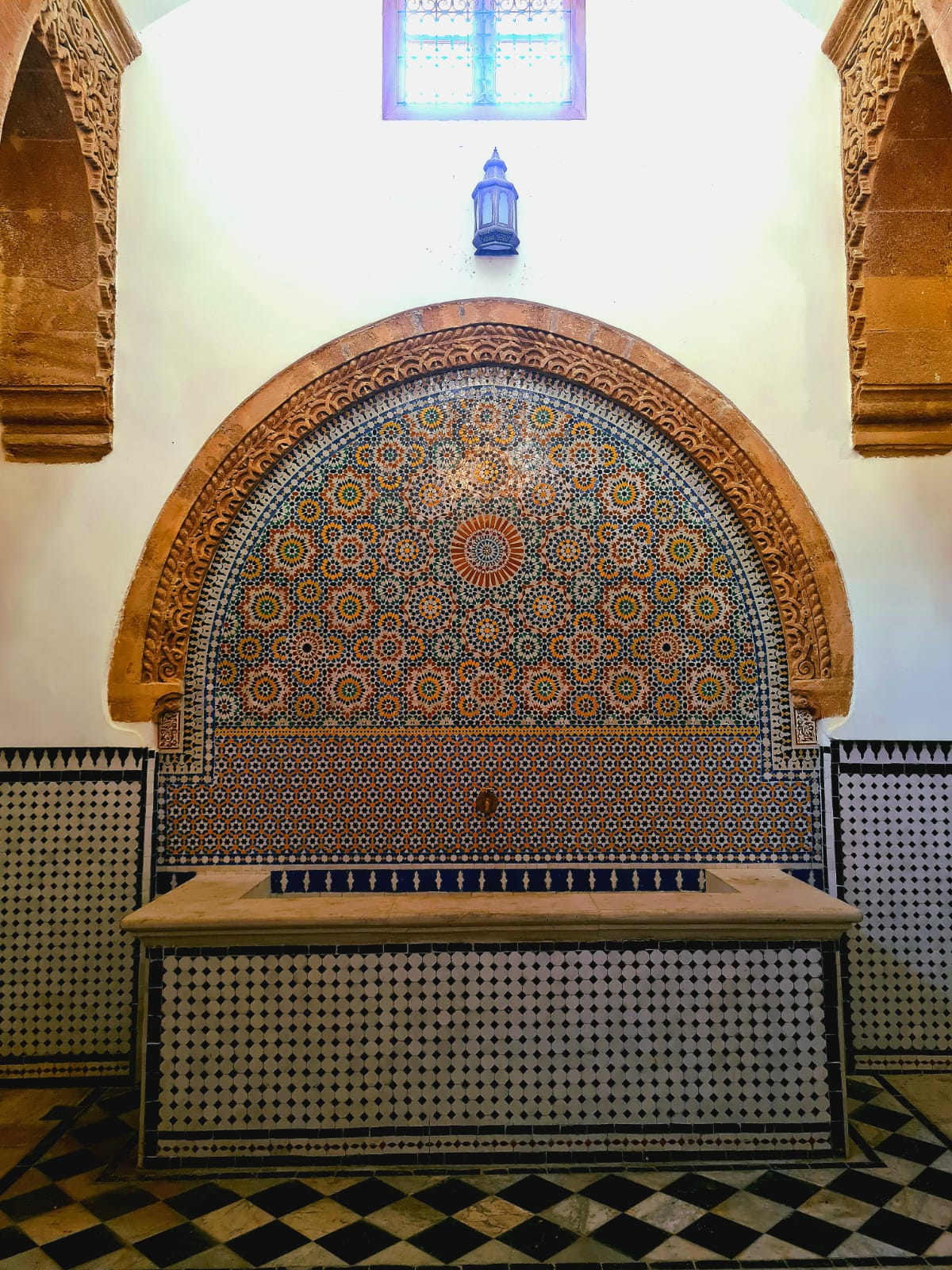
Wall fountain in the reception hall of the hammam

As with some other hammams in the city, the Saffarin Hammam is situated next to a well or natural spring which provides some of its water and is built in a sloped area which made drainage easier. Like other hammams in the city, the hammam structure is not very prominent from the exterior, but is recognizable from the rooftops by its pierced domes which are characteristic of hammam architecture. From Place Seffarine it is marked only by a horseshoe arch entrance, from which a bent passage leads to the interior.

The layout of the hammam is similar to that of most historic bathhouses in the city and was inherited from the Roman bathhouse model. The first room entered from the street, and the largest, was the undressing room (mashlah in Arabic or goulsa in the local Moroccan Arabic dialect), equivalent to the Roman apodyterium. The reception room or changing room of the Saffarin Hammam distinguished itself by being more richly decorated than that of most Moroccan hammams. The chamber consists of a large square marked out by four columns, covered by a large high dome, which is set inside a large square whose corners are covered by four smaller much domes. The main dome and the arches of the chamber are decorated with carved stucco motifs, while the lower walls are covered in zellij tilework. The southwestern wall of the chamber features a wall fountain decorated with colourful geometric patterns in zellij, below which is a water basin. The chamber also includes seats and storage lockers around its perimeter. Near the entrance is also a reception area or desk where visitors can pay for services. Visitors were generally entitled to four or five buckets of water, and had to pay if they wanted more.

From the undressing room visitors proceeded to the bathing/washing area which consisted of three rooms. Among the historic hammams in Fes, the Saffarin Hammam is unique in having separate rooms for men and women. This allowed the hammam to be open to both sexes all day long, instead of holding separate opening hours for men and women. The three rooms, in order, are: the cold room (el-barrani in the local Arabic dialect), equivalent to the frigidarium, the middle room or warm room (el-wasti in Arabic), equivalent to the tepidarium, and the hot room (ad-dakhli in Arabic), equivalent to the caldarium. All three rooms are covered in vaulted roofs. The warm rooms also have small side chamber or alcoves which can provide additional privacy for bathers. The passage leading from the undressing room to the cold room also gave access to a set of latrines (toilets today) along the way.

The rooms of the baths

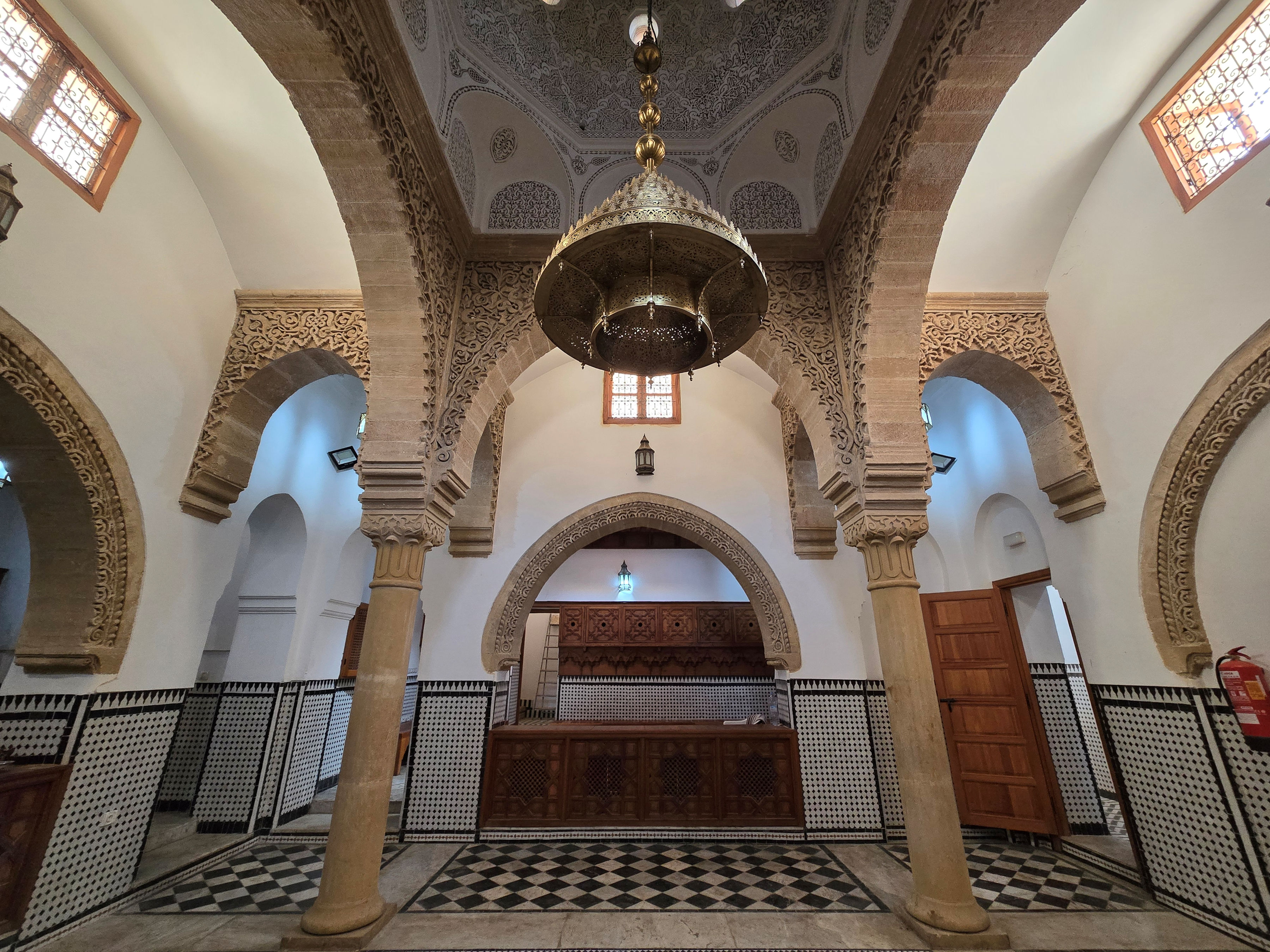
The main reception hall and changing room (goulsa)

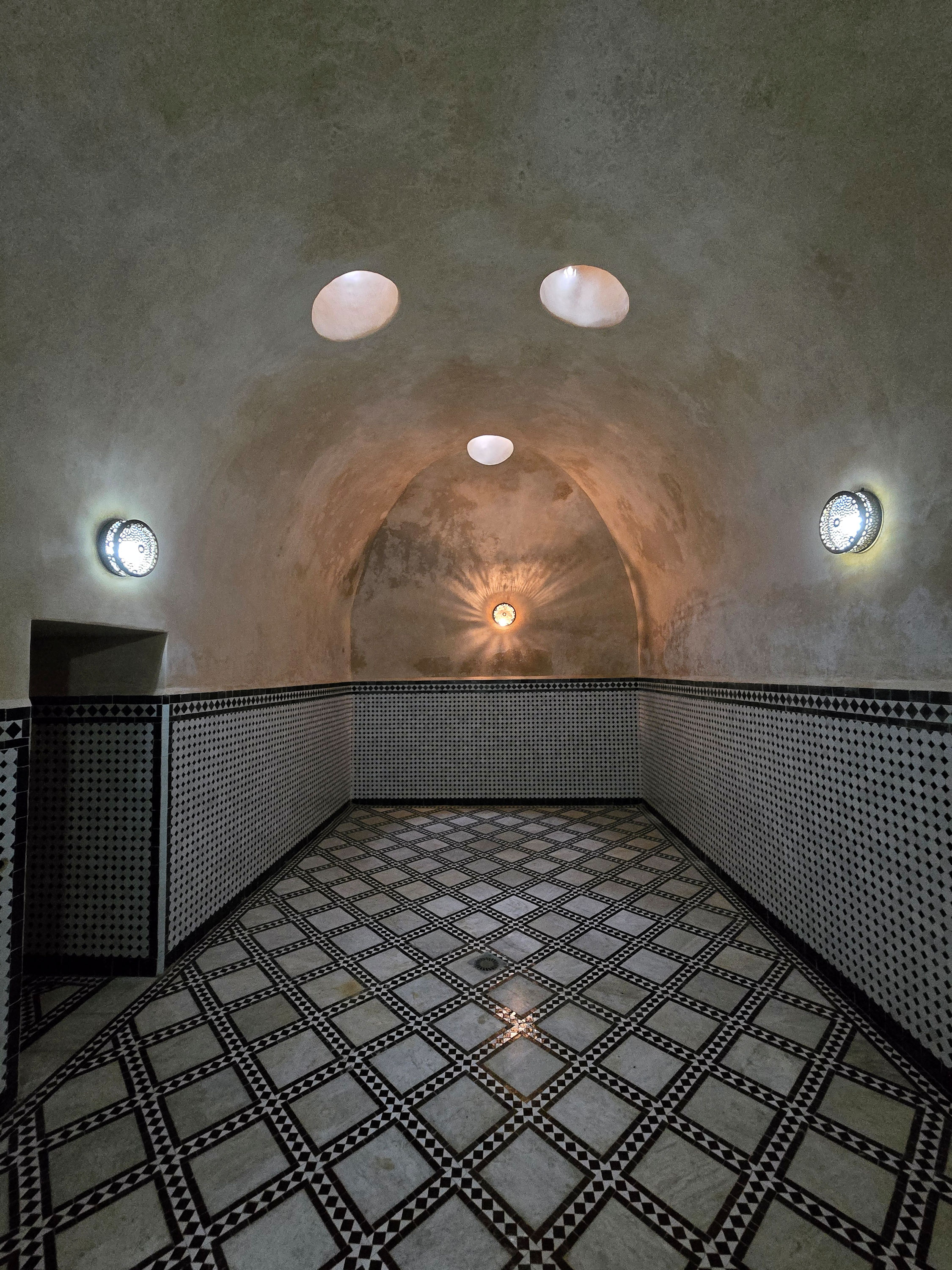
The cold room (barrani) of the northern baths

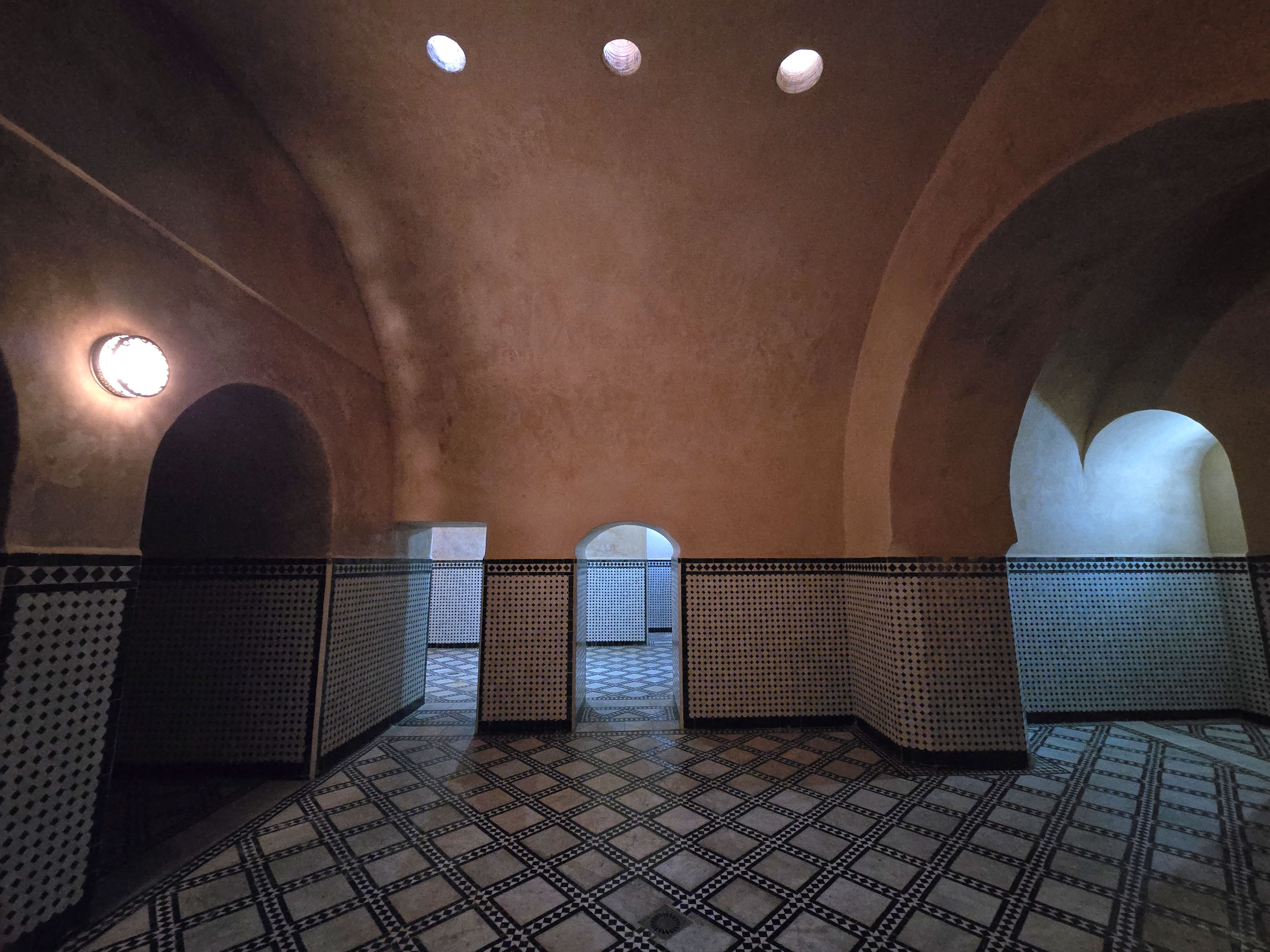
The warm room (wasti) of the northern baths

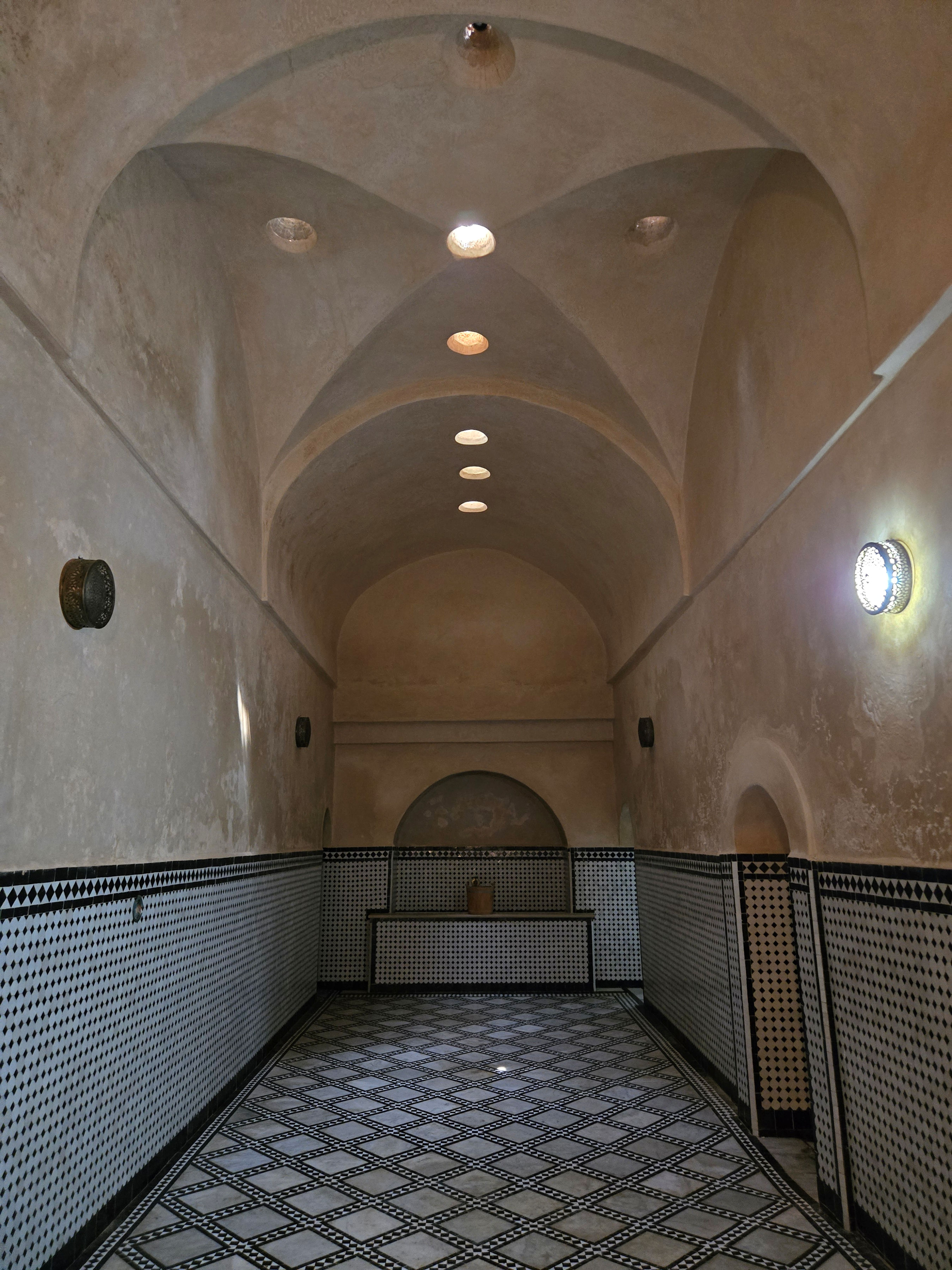
The hot room (dakhli) of the northern baths

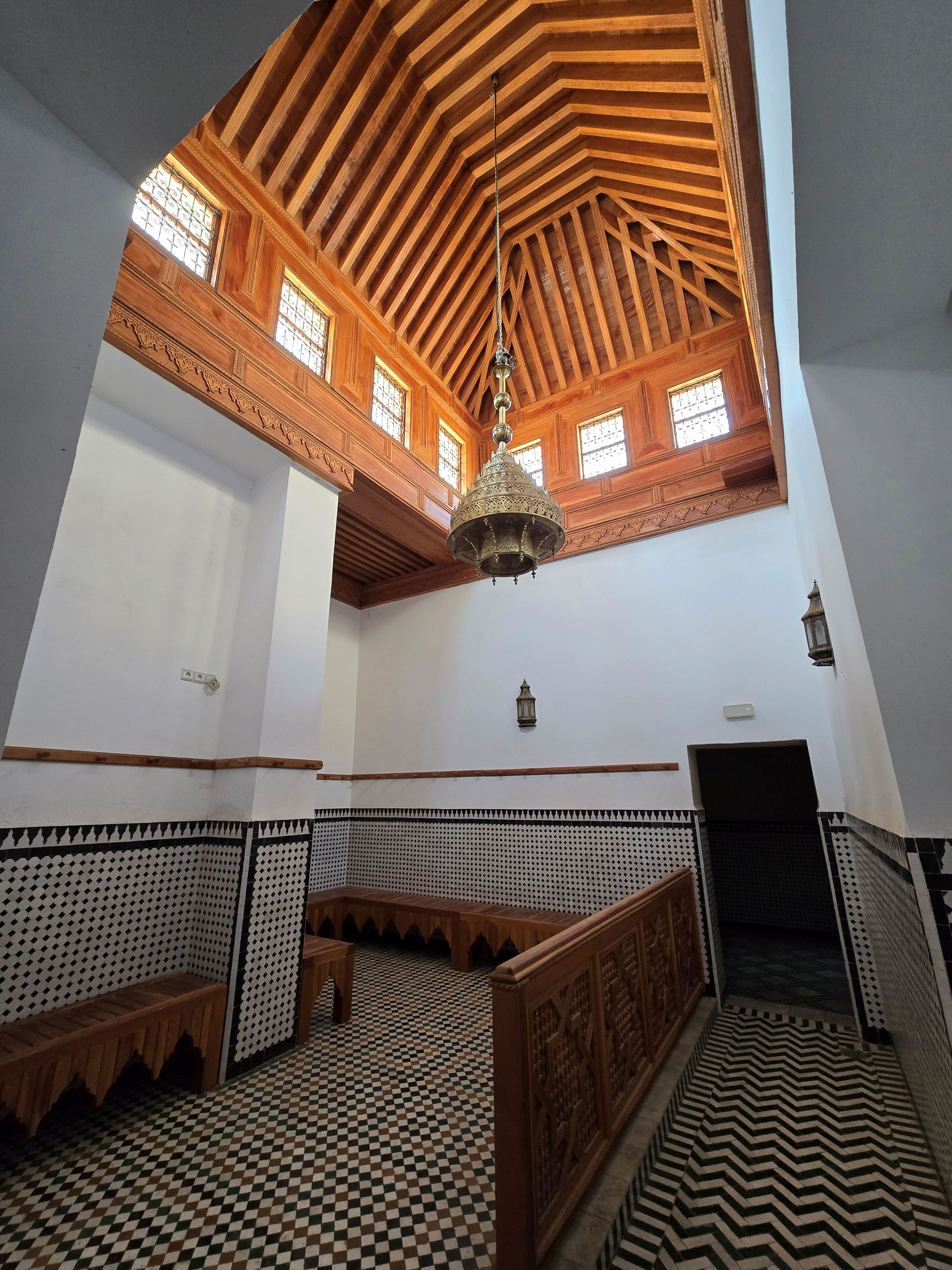
Changing room (goulsa) of the southern baths

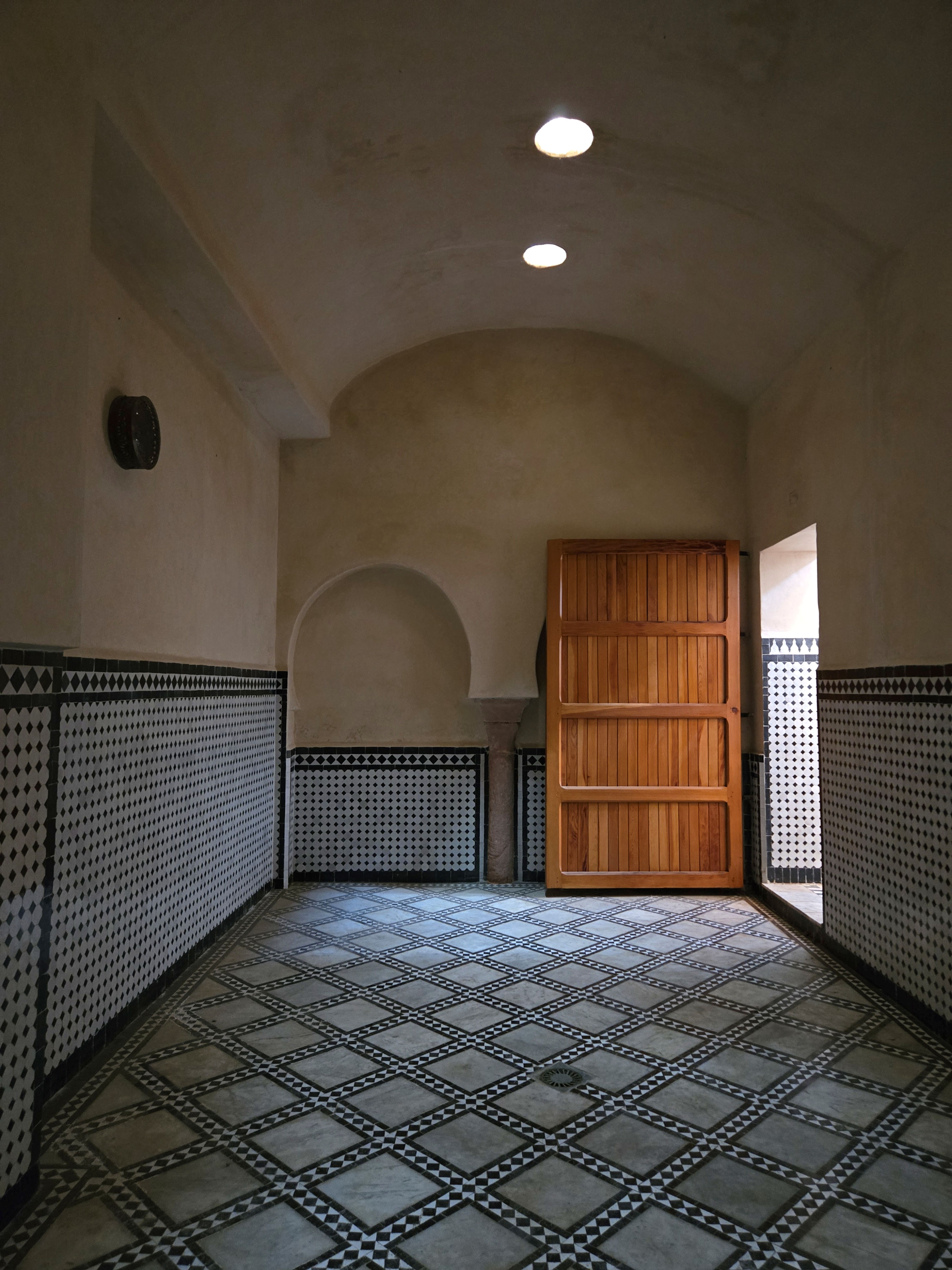
The cold room (barrani) of the southern baths

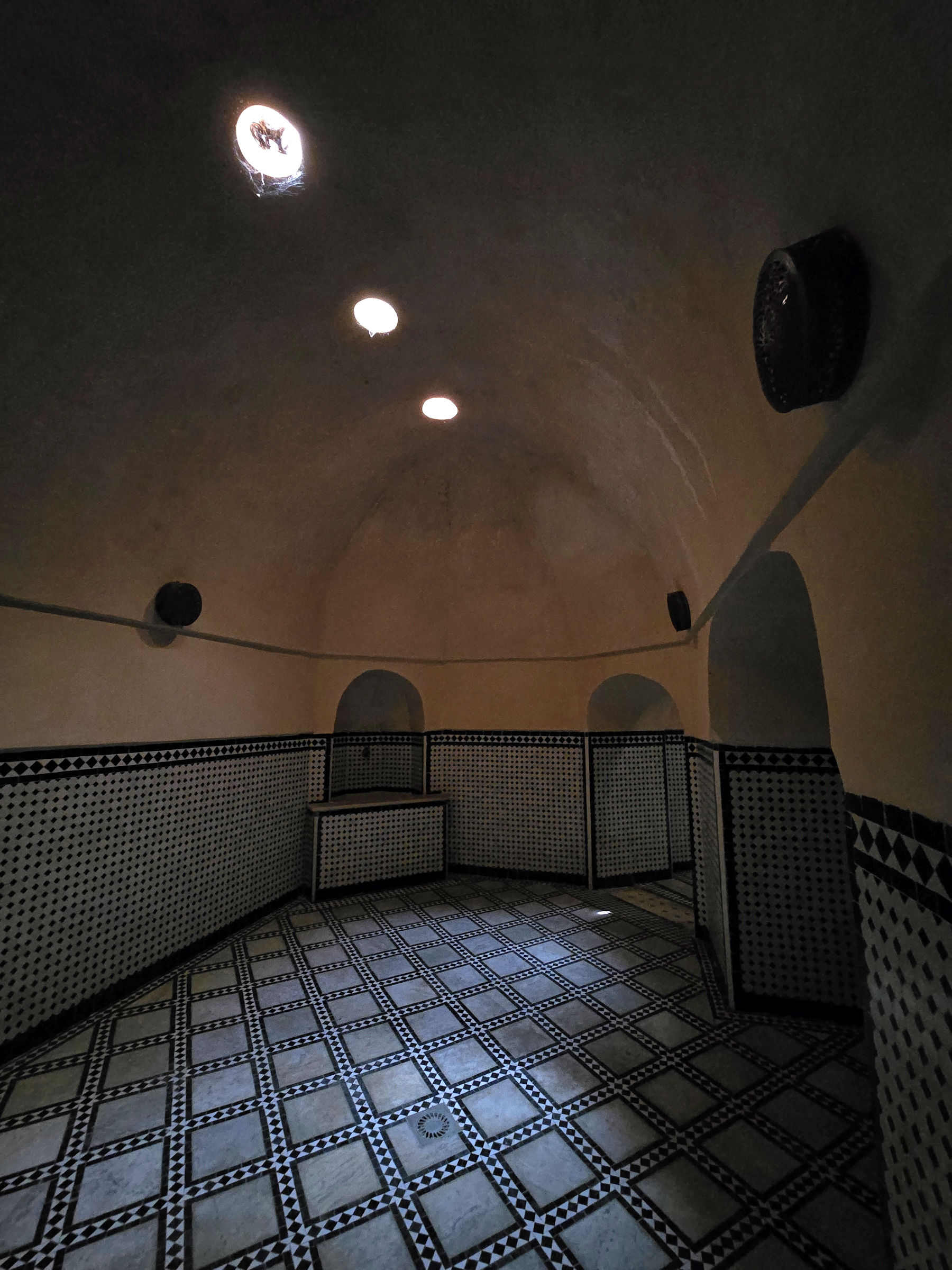
The warm room (wasti) of the southern baths

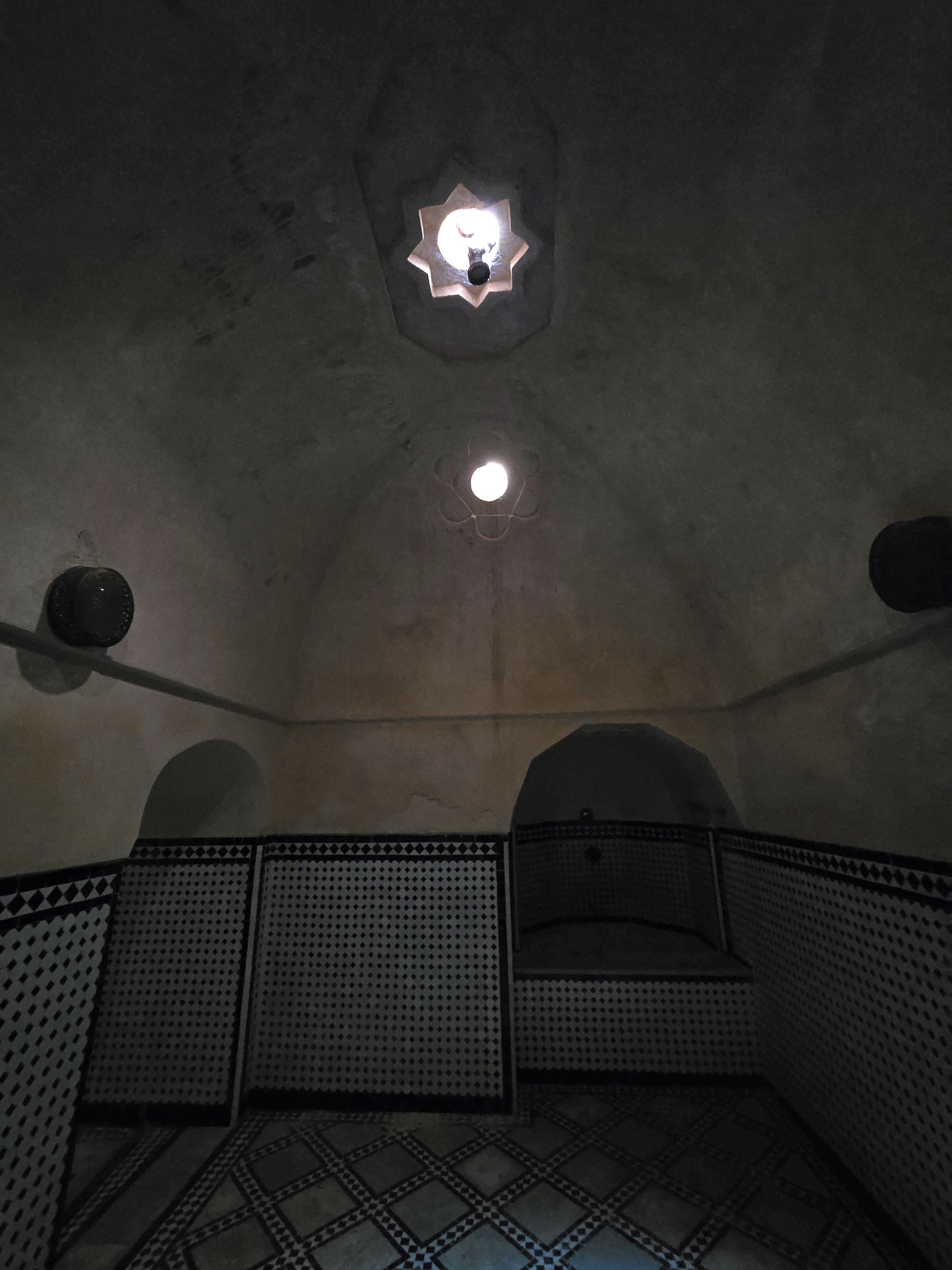
The hot room (dakhli) of the southern baths

The hammam had two furnaces (one for the women's section and one for the men's section) which, for efficiency, were located at the back of the complex right behind the hot rooms, but at a lower level than the adjoining chambers. The warm and hot rooms were heated using a traditional hypocaust system just as Roman bathhouses did. Hot smoke from the fires passed under the floors of the rooms and then rose through flues inside the walls and up to the chimneys. Water was heated in two enormous brass cauldrons (fabricated in the workshops of Place Seffarine outside) which were placed over the fires. The heated water was then carried and poured into a large water basin (called a burma) in the middle of the hot room. From this basin, water was also carried in buckets to the warm room. The furnaces require constant fuel and thus needed to be manned by labourers throughout the hammam's hours of operation. Fuel, which was transported directly to the hammam on the backs of donkeys, was provided by wood but also by recycling the waste by-products of other industries in the city such as wood shavings from carpenters' workshops and olive pits from the nearby olive presses. This traditional system continued to be used even up to the 21st century.

== See also ==
- Oued Fes
- Hammam al-Mokhfiya
- Hammam Ben Abbad
