= Madrasa of Fes el-Jdid =

Madrasa in Fez, Morocco

- مدرسة فاس الجديد
- Alternative names: Madrasa Dar al-Makhzen

General information
- Type: madrasa
- Architectural style: Marinid
- Location: Fes, Morocco
- Coordinates: 34°03′24.6″N 4°59′28.3″W
- Completed: 1320 CE

The Madrasa of Fes el-Jdid, also known as the Madrasa of Dar al-Makhzen, was a 14th-century madrasa built by the Marinid dynasty in the Fes el-Jdid quarter of Fez, Morocco. The madrasa was later converted into a mosque and integrated into the expanded Dar al-Makhzen (Royal Palace) of Fez, where it still stands today.

== History ==
In 1320, the Marinid sultan Abu Sa'id built a madrasa located a short distance south of the Great Mosque of Fes el-Jdid. It became known as the Madrasa Fes Jdid or Madrasa Dar al-Makhzen. It was only the second madrasa built by the Marinids in Fes, the first one having been the Seffarine Madrasa founded in 1271 near the Qarawiyyin Mosque. Shortly after, in 1321, also under Abu Sa'id's reign, the Sahrij Madrasa was built near the al-Andalus Mosque. Accordingly, it is likely that Abu Sa'id desired to create centers of learning around each of Fes's great mosques. However, it does not appear that the Fes el-Jdid madrasa developed into a major center of learning, and instead the most prestigious madrasas remained the al-Qarawiyyin and the other Marinid madrasas later built in Fes el-Bali. It was later absorbed by the Royal Palace complex when Sultan Moulay Hassan (ruled 1873-1894) expanded the mechouar area of the palace to the northeast, which resulted in the madrasa being cut off from the mosque and integrated into the inner mechouar. The madrasa, likely derelict before then, was renovated and given a minaret, before being renovated again under the French Protectorate some time after 1924.

== Architecture ==
The madrasa's basic layout is typical of other madrasas of the time. It is centered around a rectangular courtyard (sahn), measuring 10.3 by 9.25 metres, with a rectangular water basin in its center. Along either side (the western and eastern sides) was a gallery of arches behind which were small rooms to house the students. The madrasa and its gallery have no upper floor nowadays, but it is probable that they originally had one, much like the Sahrij or al-Attarin Madrasas of the same era. On the courtyard's north side is the main entrance, while facing it across the courtyard, to the south, is a prayer hall that is much wider than it is deep. The prayer hall could be entered through three doorways with horseshoe arches: a large central one and two smaller ones on either side. The facades of the courtyard were decorated with niches or blind arches framed by carved wood and stucco decoration. The prayer hall was more heavily decorated, though the mihrab itself has lost any original ornamentation. At the building's northwest corner is a minaret which was not part of the original building but was added by Moulay Hassan when the madrasa was integrated into the palace.
