= Hammam al-Mokhfiya =

Historic building in Fez, Morocco

Coordinates: 34°03′37.8″N 4°58′18.6″W

Hammam al-Mokhfiya (also spelled Mukhfiyya or Makhfia) is a historic hammam (bathhouse) in the medina (old city) of Fes, Morocco. It is located in the neighbourhood of the same name (al-Mokhfiya), south of Place R'cif. Based on its similarities in layout and decoration with other historic hammams in the region, it has been dated to the mid-14th century, during the reign of the Marinid sultan Abu Inan (ruled 1348–1358) or slightly after. The hammam is richly decorated with carved stucco and carved wood in its changing room, as well as zellij tiling in its steam rooms. The hammam was part of the habous (endowment) of the Qarawiyyin Mosque.

== See also ==
- Hammam Saffarin
- Hammam Ben Abbad
