= Place Seffarine =

Public square in Fez, Morocco

Coordinates: 34°03′51.1″N 4°58′22.1″W

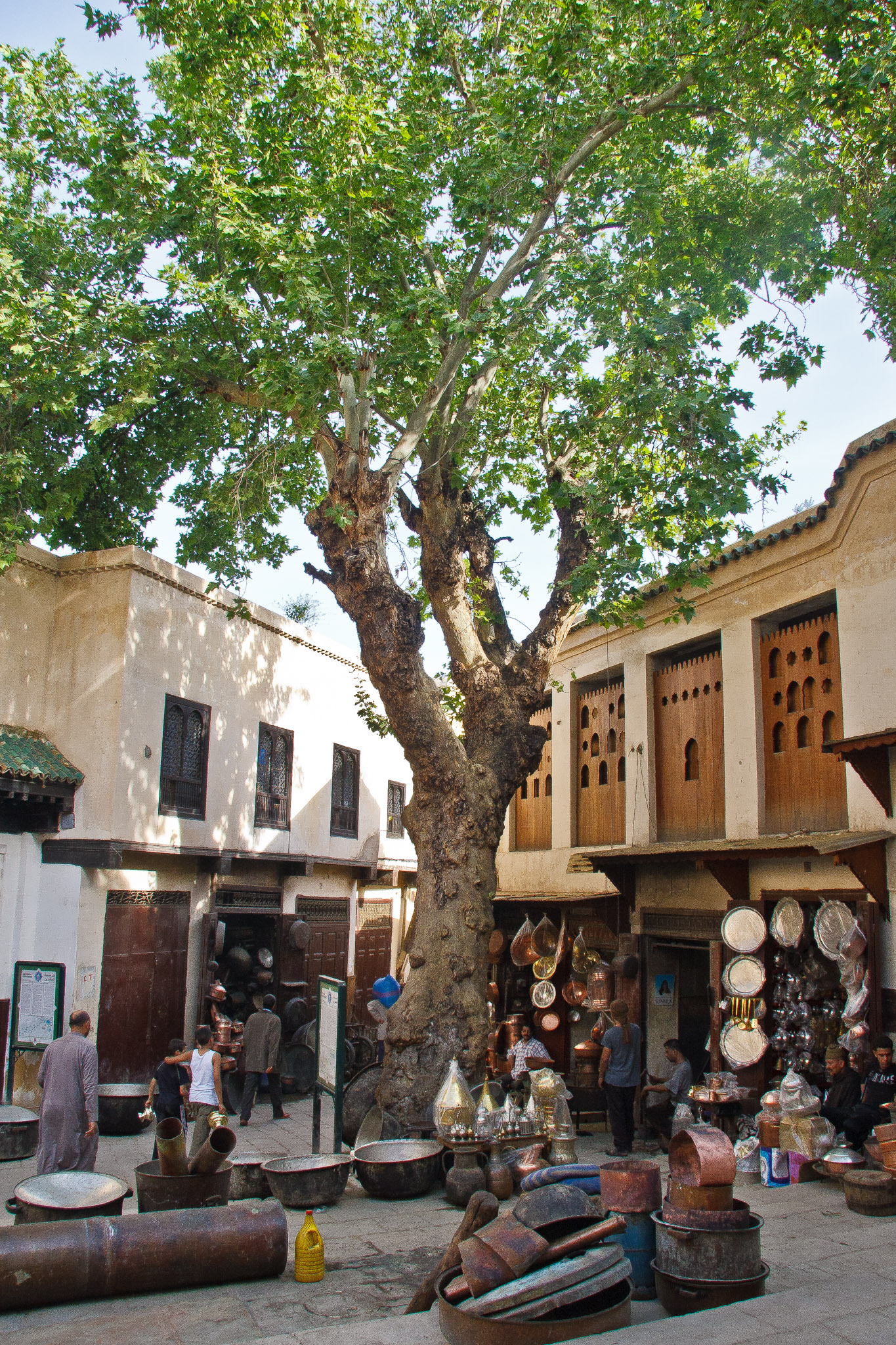
Place Seffarine

Place Seffarine or Seffarine Square (Arabic: ساحة الصفارين; also transliterated as Saffarin) is a small square in the medina (old city) of Fes, Morocco. It is located on the south side of the Qarawiyyin Mosque, close to the Bou Khrareb River which runs through the heart of the medina. The square dates back to the Middle Ages but has also undergone renovations in modern times. It is adjoined by the Qarawiyyin's library to the northwest, by the Saffarin Madrasa to the east, and by the Saffarin Hammam (bathhouse) to the southwest. It is named after the coppersmiths (seffarin or saffarin; Arabic: الصفارين) who have had their workshops here for centuries.

== History ==
The square was historically the main souq (market) of the city's coppersmiths (Arabic: الصفارين, romanized: saffarin), who gave the square its name. They are still present today. Their workshops have been established here since at least the 16th century, when Leo Africanus noted their presence. The Saffarin Madrasa, whose entrance is on this square, was built here in 1271 CE by the Marinid sultan Abu Yusuf Ya'qub and is the oldest purpose-built madrasa in Morocco. It is still in use today and was most recently renovated in the late 2010s. The Qarawiyyin library on the northwest side of the square was first built here in the late 16th century by Sultan Ahmad al-Mansur, although the Qarawiyyin had an earlier library built further north in 1349 by Abu Inan. The Saffarin Hammam also dates to the 14th century during the Marinid era.

The square underwent a significant set of renovations in the 1930s and 1940s during the French protectorate period due to a request by the manager of the habous (endowments) of the Qarawiyyin, as well as on the initiatives of King Mohammed V. This program of restorations, which affected many of the surrounding buildings and boutiques, has given the square much of its present-day appearance. In the process, the library of the Qarawiyyin was significantly expanded and was reopened in 1949 in its current form seen today. The Madrasa Mohammadia, an annex to the Saffarin Madrasa added in the 18th century, was also significantly renovated and expanded at this time. More recently, in the 2010s, several of the surrounding structures were again renovated, including the two madrasas (Saffarin and Mohammadia) and the Qarawiyyin library. The Saffarin Hammam was also recently undergoing restoration, under the supervision of architect Rachid Halaoui, as part of an Austrian-led project to restore various historic hammams across the Mediterranean region.
