= Hammam Ben Abbad =

Historic building in Fez, Morocco

Coordinates: 34°03′47.7″N 4°58′28.6″W

Hammam Ben Abbad or Hammam Ibn Abbad is a historic hammam (bathhouse) in the medina (old city) of Fes, Morocco. It is located in the Kettanin neighbourhood south of the Zawiya of Moulay Idris, near the Funduq Kettanin. The hammam dates from the 14th century and was recently restored during a major rehabilitation program involving over two dozen other historic monuments in the city. Its name comes from a local Muslim saint who is associated with the building, and the waters of the hammam were believed to have healing properties. Entered from the north, the hammam has the usual series of rooms inherited from the Roman bathhouse model: an undressing room (equivalent to an apodyterium), a cold room (frigidarium), warm room (tepidarium), and a hot room (calderium). The hammam was part of the habous (endowment) of the Qarawiyyin Mosque.

== See also ==
- Hammam Saffarin
- Hammam al-Mokhfiya
