= Sahrij Madrasa =

Madrasa in Fez, Morocco

Madrasa as-Sahrij
- مدرسة الصهريج
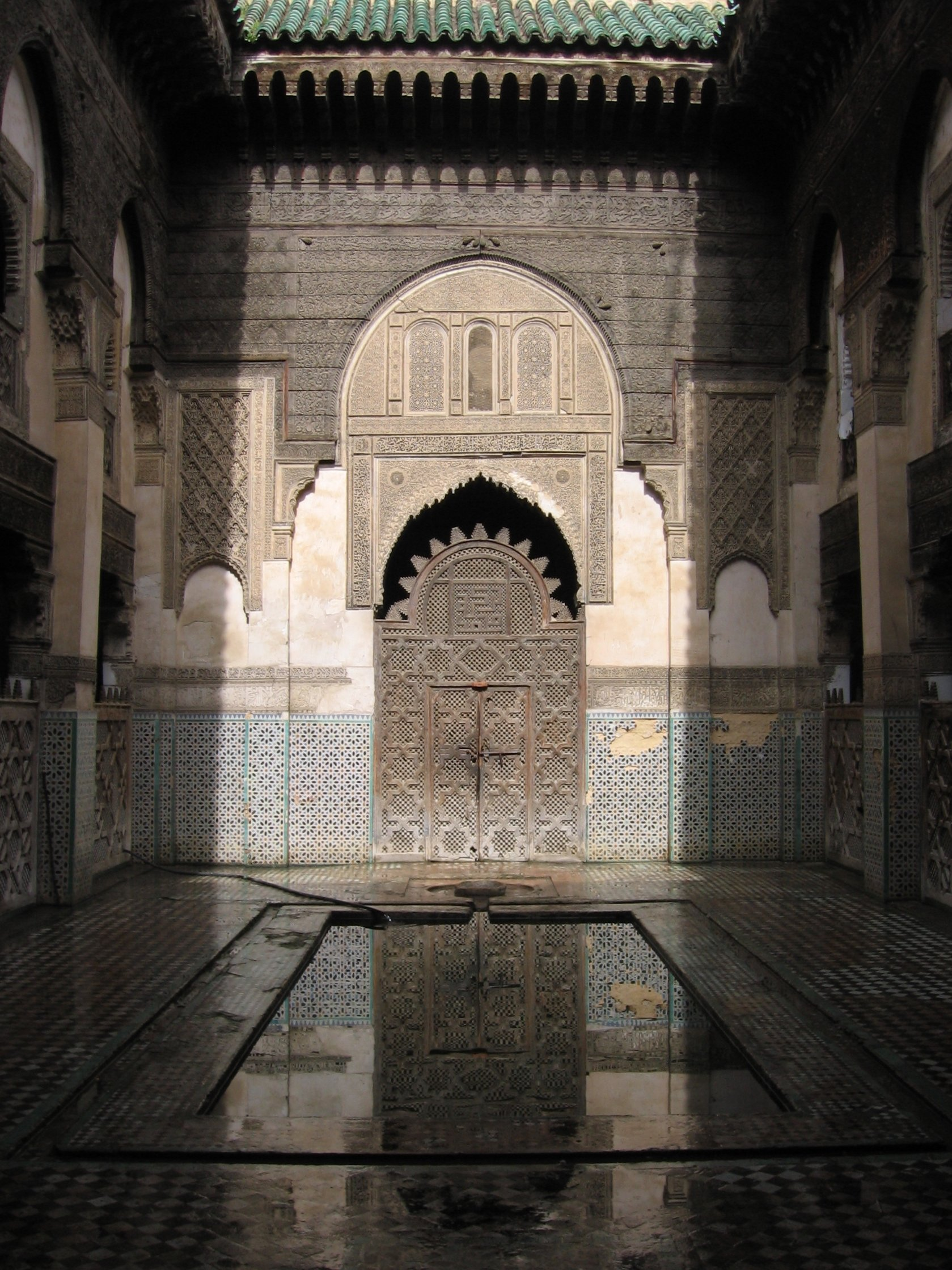
- Courtyard of the madrasa, looking northwest towards the entrance
- Former names: Madrasa al-Kubra

General information
- Type: madrasa
- Architectural style: Moorish (Marinid)
- Location: Fes, Morocco
- Coordinates: 34°03′46.4″N 4°58′7.3″W
- Construction started: 1321
- Completed: 1323

Technical details
- Material: cedar wood, brick, stucco, tile
- Floor count: 2
- Grounds: 478 square meters

The Sahrij Madrasa (Arabic: مدرسة الصهريج, romanized: madrasat as-sahrij), also rendered as the Madrasa al-Sahrij or Sihrij Madrasa, is a madrasa in Fez, Morocco. It is located inside Fes el Bali, the old medina quarter of the city. The madrasa dates back to the 14th century during the golden age of Fez under Marinid rule. The madrasa is located near the Mosque of the Andalusians and is also connected to another, smaller, madrasa built at the same time, the Sba'iyyin Madrasa.

== History ==
=== Historical background and function ===
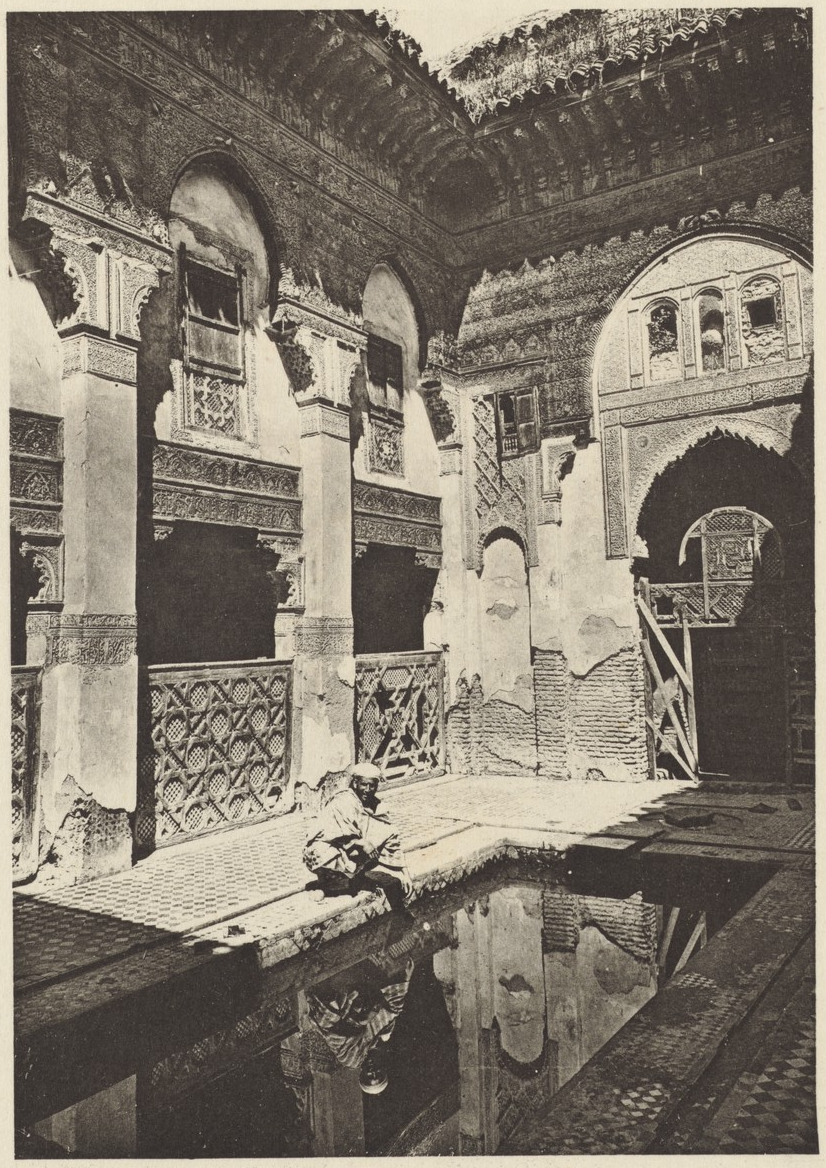
The Sahrij Madrasa circa 1922, before modern restorations

The madrasa was commissioned in 1321 by Abu al-Hassan, who was at that time a prince and heir apparent to his father, Sultan Abu Sa'id Uthman II. A foundation inscription carved onto an onyx plaque in the prayer hall records that construction was completed in Rabi' I 1323 and that teaching began at this time. Abu al-Hasan reportedly built the madrasa in honour of his father. He went on to become sultan in 1331 and was a prolific patron of mosques and madrasas in Fez.

According to its foundation inscription, the madrasa was originally known as al-Madrasa al-Kubra (the "Greater Madrasa") because it was larger than the other madrasas of the same era. It also marked a significant evolution in the richness of its decoration, and features some of the earliest zellij (mosaic tilework) to be found in any Moroccan madrasa. It was reported that the madrasa's construction had cost 100,000 gold pieces. Later it came to be known as the Madrasa as-Sahrij for the iconic sahrij (water basin) in the center of its courtyard (sahn). Abu al-Hassan also built another smaller madrasa adjoining it, commissioned in 1323 and initially known as the al-Madrasa es-Sughra (the "Lesser/Smaller Madrasa"). That madrasa later came to be known as the Madrasa as-Sba'iyyin (roughly: "Madrasa of those who teach the Seven Recitations of the Qur'an"), the name it still has today, presumably due to the madrasa's specialization in this subject. Together, these two madrasas provided both lodging and teaching for students studying at the nearby Andalus Mosque, much as the Seffarine and al-Attarine Madrasas served students at the al-Qarawiyyin Mosque across the river. The madrasas were also accompanied by another funduq or hospice, but it has since disappeared.

The madrasa was assigned a fqih (judge and expert in Islamic jurisprudence) and a number of other positions such as lecturers and Qur'an reciters, all of whom were provided with accommodations and salaries. The madrasa's upkeep and operations were funded in large part by charitable endowments designated under a habous or waqf (a trust under Islamic law). In addition to its function as an educational institution, Marinid madrasas like this one could also serve as centers of community life, functioning as a mosque, guesthouse, and venue for local ceremonies.

=== Restorations ===
The madrasa was restored multiple times, including during the Saadian period (16th-early 17th century) and again between 1917 and 1924 by the Service des Beaux-Arts under the French Protectorate. The madrasa complex eventually fell into neglect. There were initial efforts to repair and protect it in the 2000s, including from the World Monuments Fund, but the madrasa suffered from further vandalism, including serious damage done to the adjoining Sba'iyyin Madrasa in 2009 due to looting. The two madrasas were more recently restored by the local heritage agency ADER-Fès and reopened in 2017, as part of a wider program of rehabilitation for Fes el-Bali which started in 2013. Upon the restoration's completion, the Sahrij Madrasa was earmarked to house students of the Qarawiyyin University and to serve the university's courses on Arabic calligraphy.

== Architecture ==
The madrasa covers 478 square meters. The structure follows the prevalent pattern of the Marinid-era madrasas, with a rectangular sahn (courtyard) surrounded by galleries which led to accommodations for the students on either side. Sleeping quarters for the students also existed on the second floor and numbered 26 in total. On the south side of the courtyard, across from the main entrance, was a prayer hall with a mihrab. The foundation plaque and inscription of the building is located in this room. The sahn is richly ornamented by zellij tiles, carved wood, and carved stucco, in a style shared with Nasrid architecture of the same era such as that of the Alhambra palaces. A passage between the sahn and the street entrance gives access to the stairs to the upper level and then to another, slightly smaller, courtyard to the west which contains the latrines.

Details of the building (prior to most recent restoration)

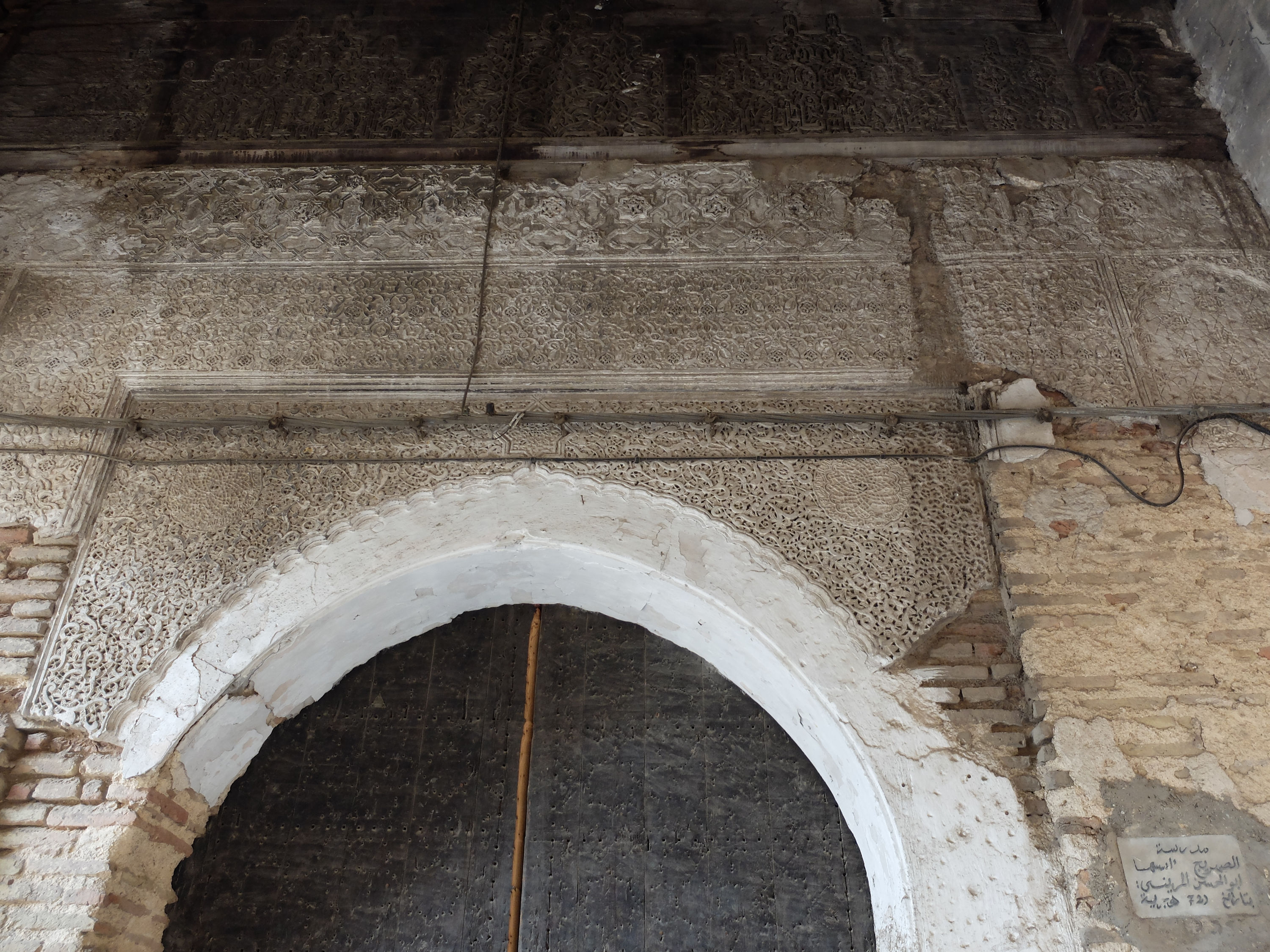
Decoration around the street entrance of the madrasa

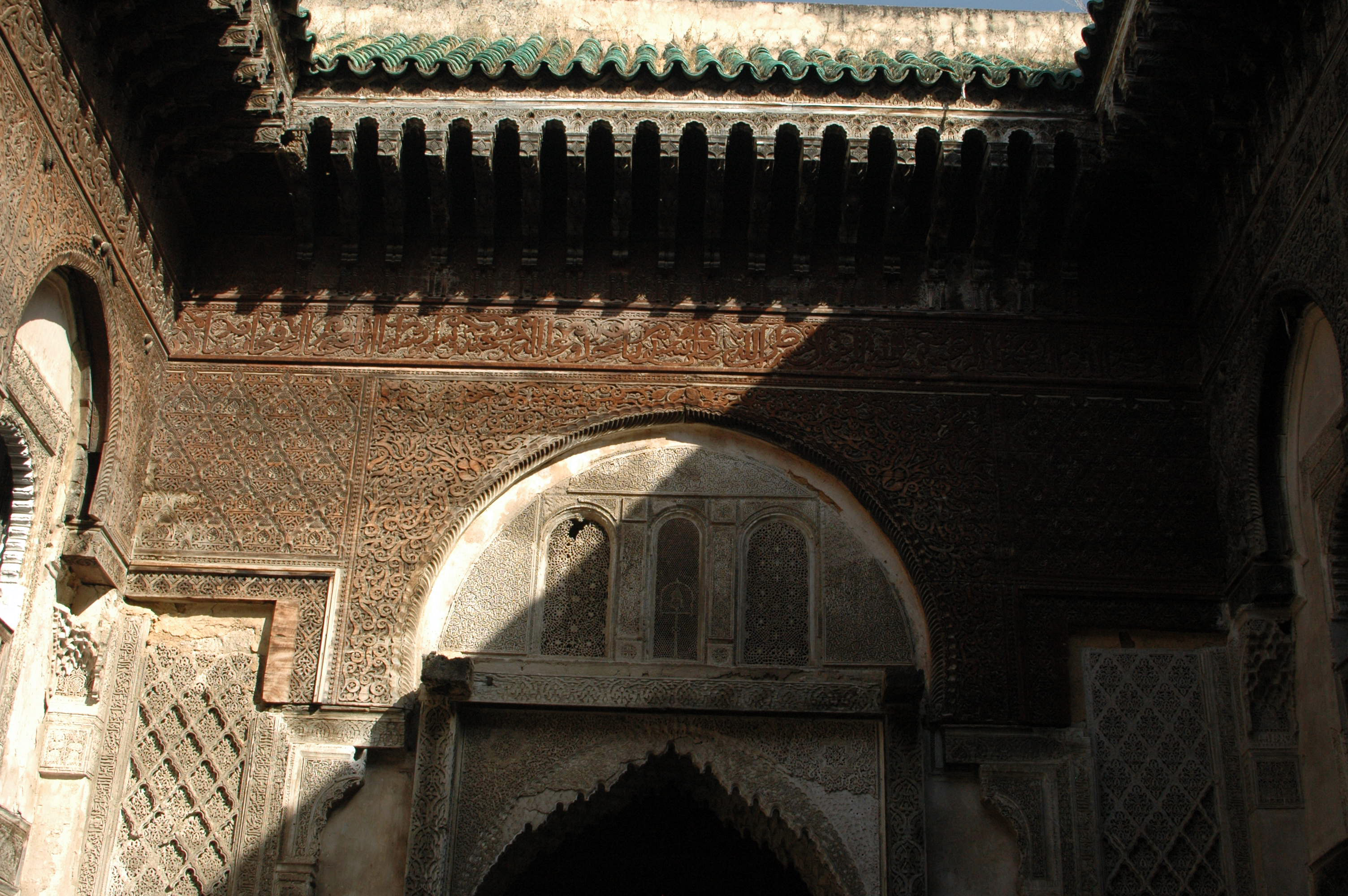
Decoration on the upper walls of the courtyard, looking southeast towards the prayer hall

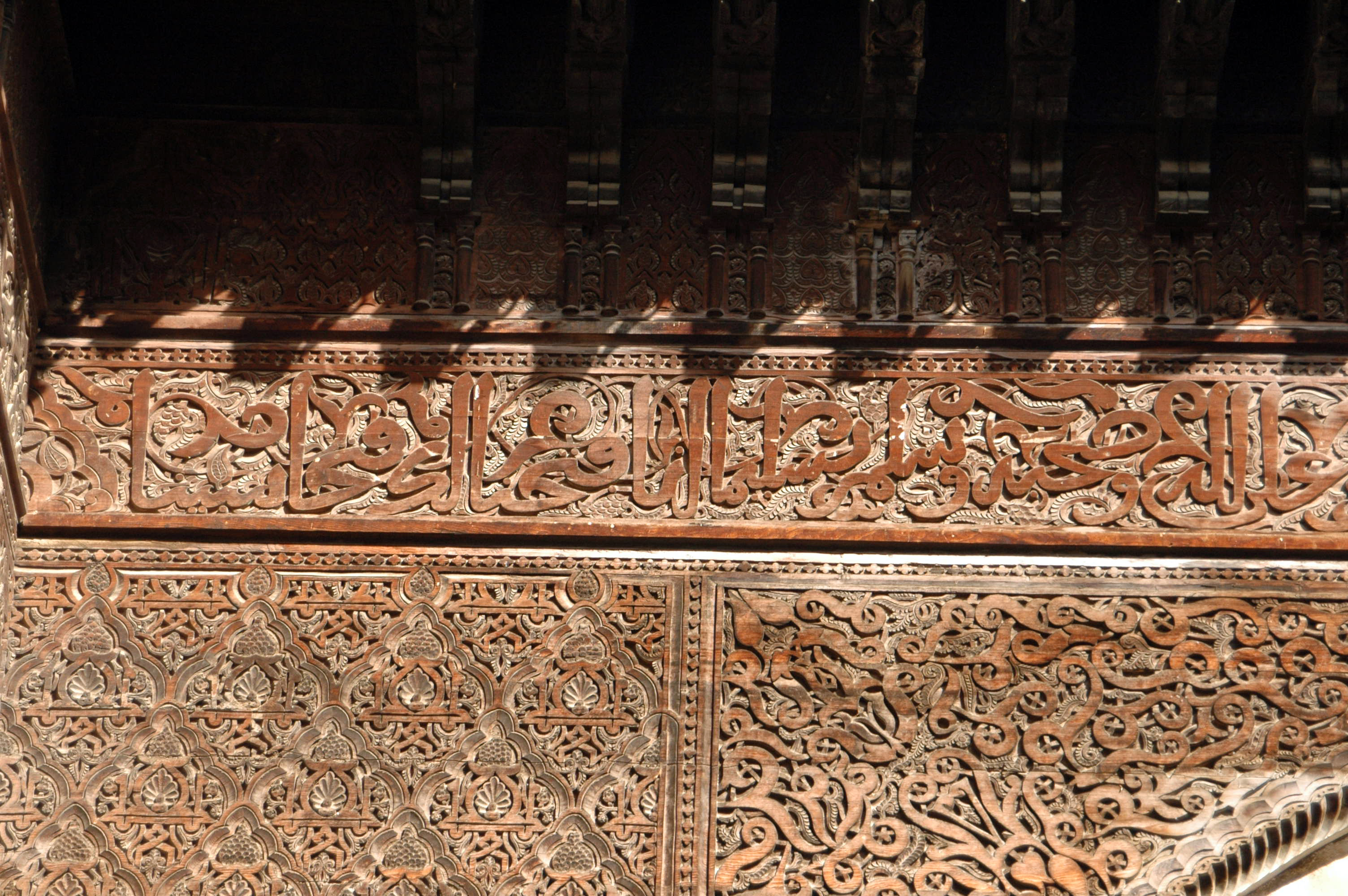
Detail of wood-carved inscriptions and arabesque motifs

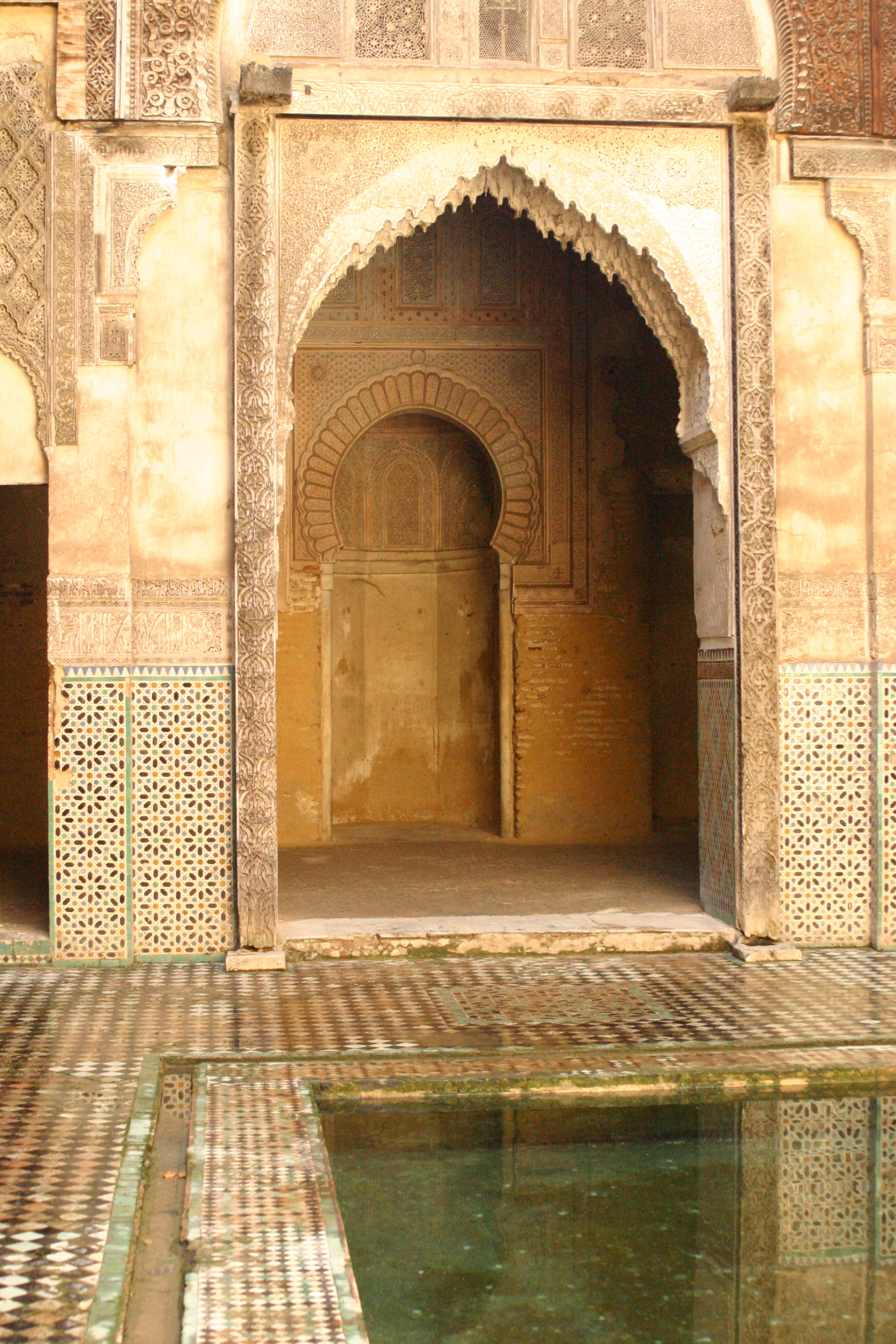
View towards the prayer hall and the mihrab inside

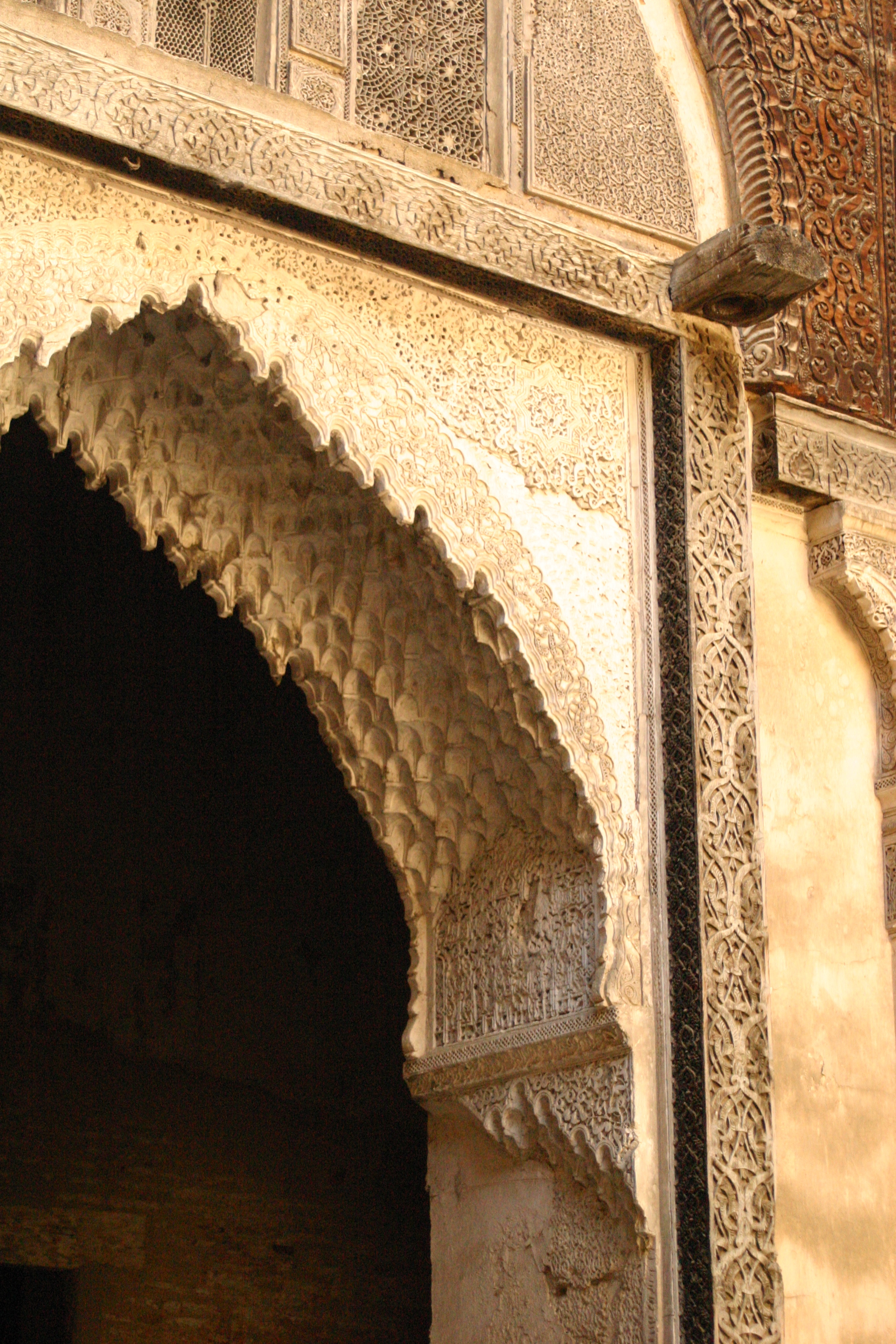
Detail of the muqarnas arch leading to the prayer hall

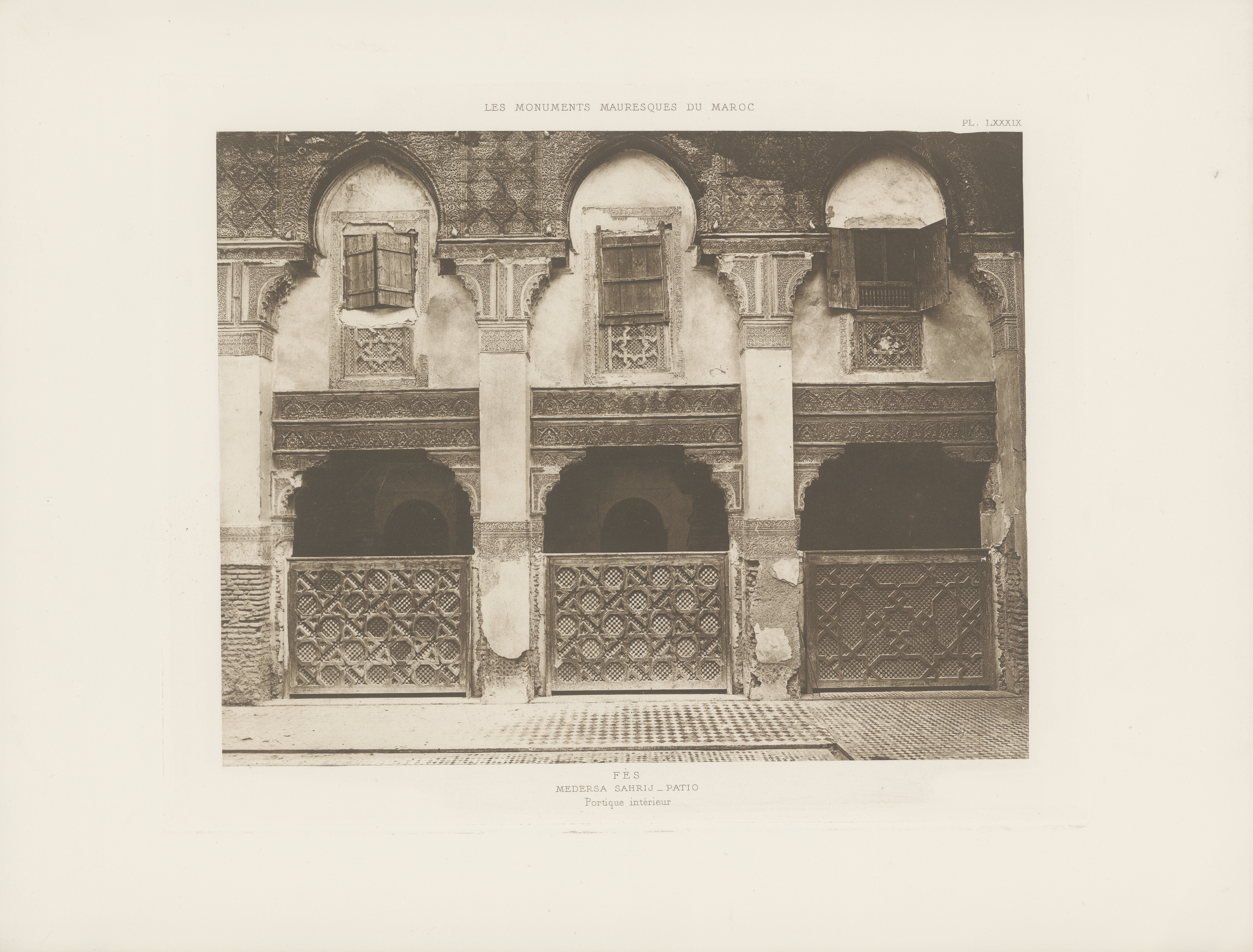
View of the lateral gallery (from a 1921 photo)

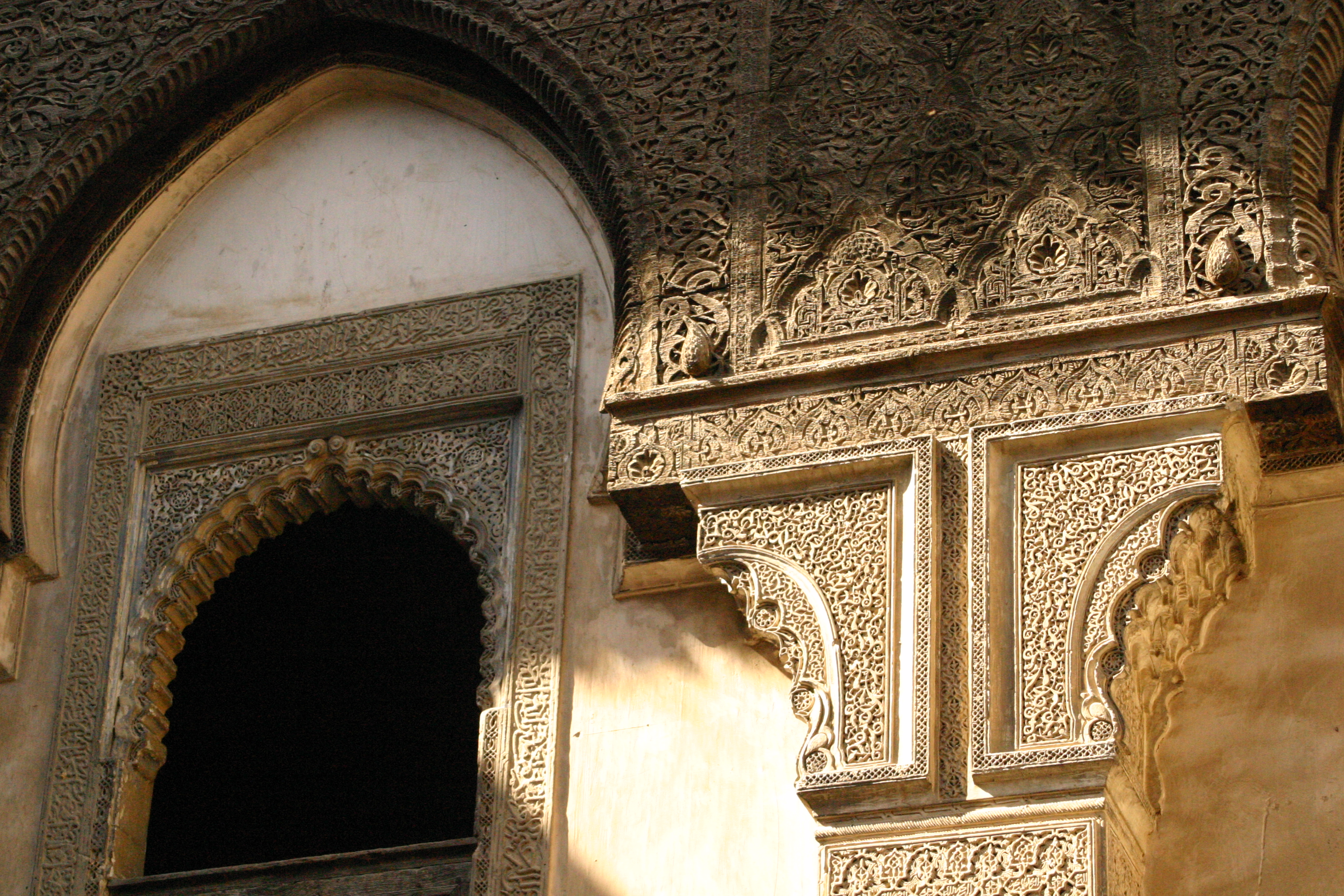
Carved wood and stucco around one of the windows along the upper level of the courtyard

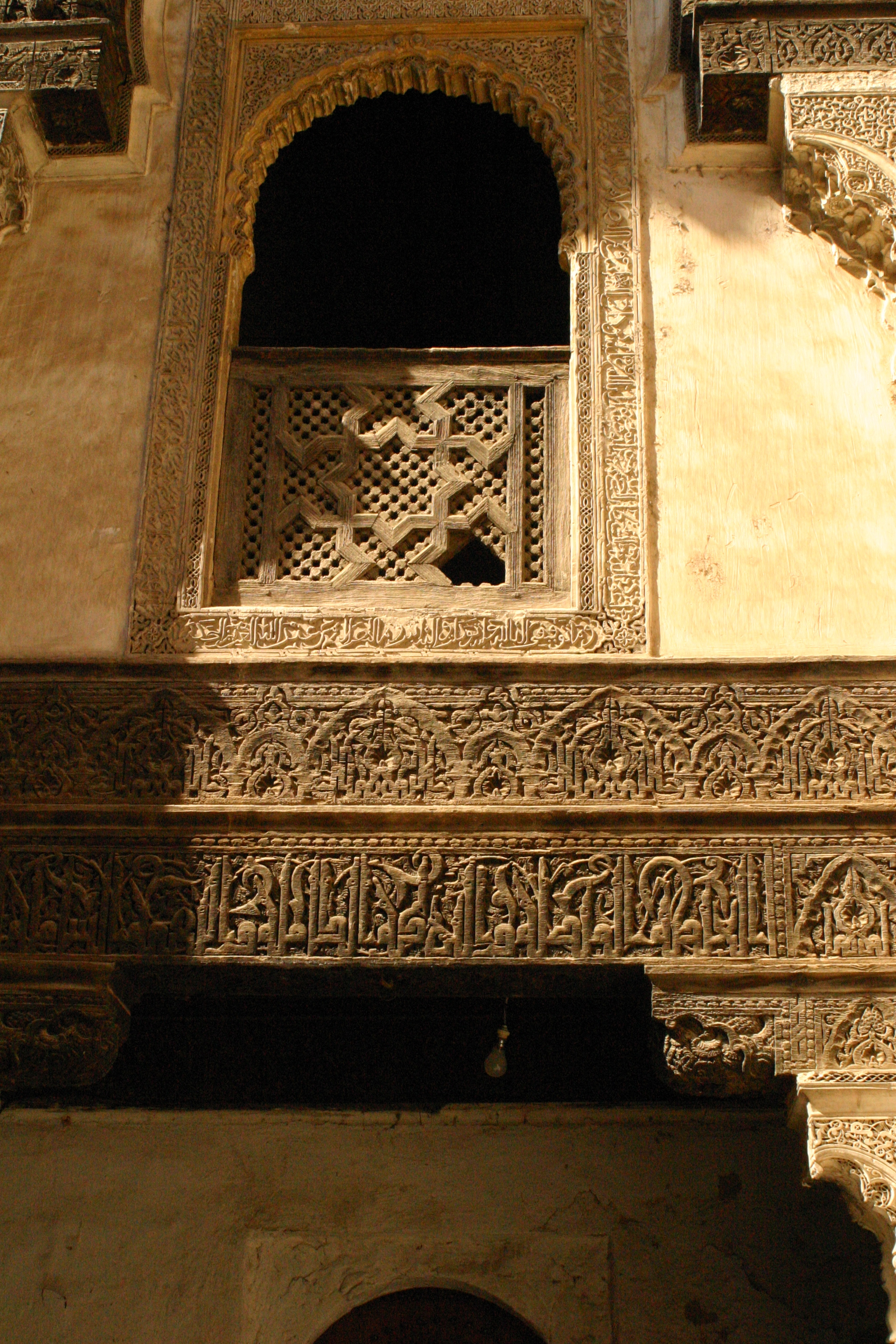
Details below one of the windows

== See also ==
- Bou Inania Madrasa
- Madrasa of Abu al-Hassan (in Salé)
