= Saffarin Madrasa =

Madrasa in Fez, Morocco

- مدرسة الصفارين
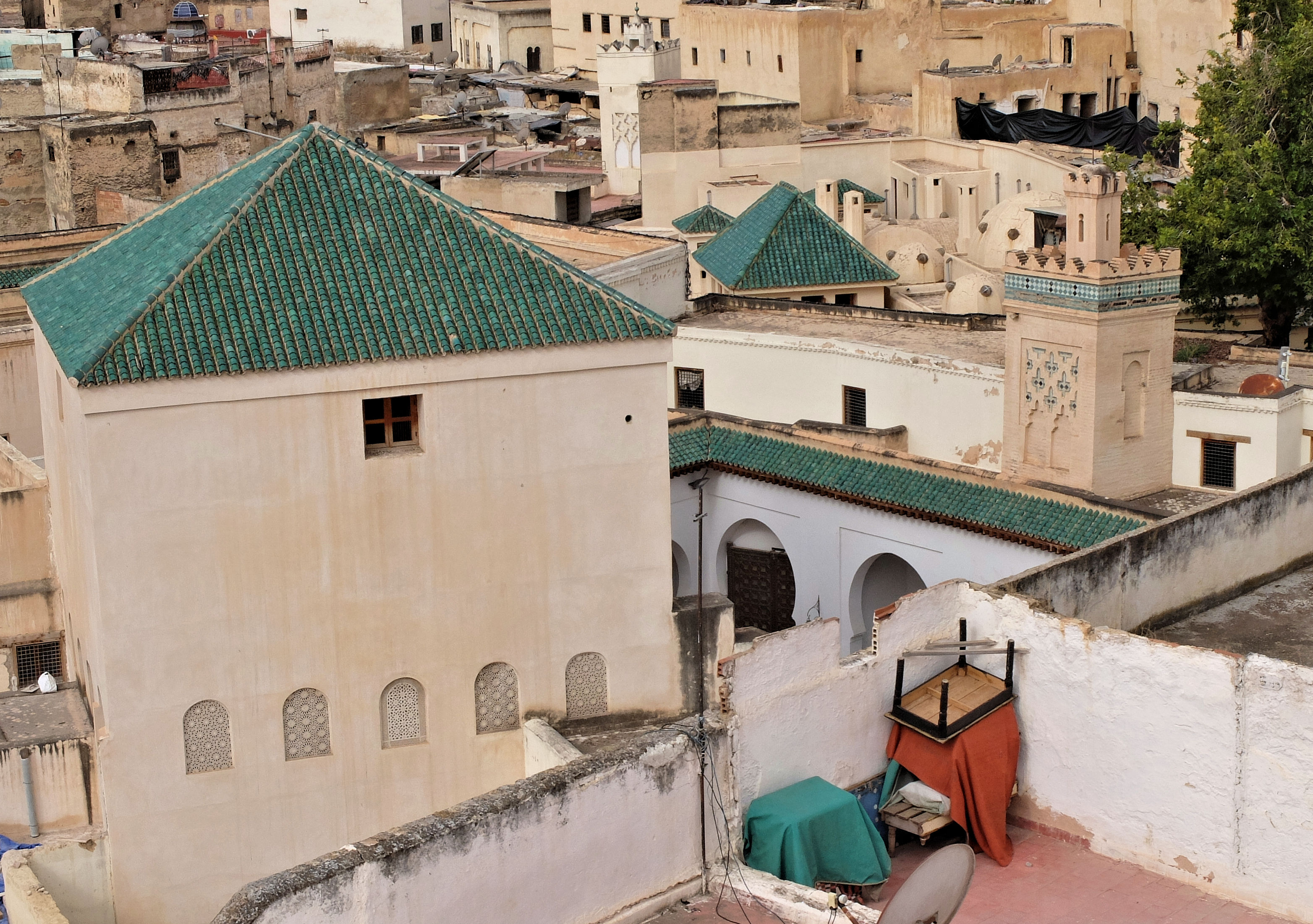
- Rooftop view of the madrasa

Religion
- Affiliation: Islam

Location
- Location: Fez, Morocco
- Interactive map of Saffarin Madrasa
- Coordinates: 34°3′50.95″N 4°58′21.26″W

Architecture
- Type: madrasa
- Style: Moorish (Marinid)
- Completed: 1271

Specifications
- Minaret: 1
- Materials: brick, wood

Saffarin Madrasa (Arabic: مدرسة الصفارين, lit. 'madrasa of the metalworkers') is a madrasa in Fes el-Bali, the old medina quarter of Fez, Morocco. It was built in 1271 CE (670 AH) by the Marinid Sultan Abu Ya'qub Yusuf and was the first of many madrasas built by the Marinid dynasty during their reign. It is located just south of the 9th-century Qarawiyyin Mosque on Saffarin Square (or Place Seffarine), which is named after the coppersmiths (Arabic: الصفارين, romanized: saffarin) who work in the square.

== History ==
=== Role of madrasas in Fez ===
Madrasas were a type of institution which originated in northeastern Iran by the early 11th century and was progressively adopted further west. These establishments served to train Islamic scholars, particularly in Islamic law and jurisprudence (fiqh). The madrasa in the Sunni world was generally antithetical to more "heterodox" religious doctrines, including the doctrine espoused by the Almohad dynasty. As such, it only took hold in Morocco under the Marinid dynasty which succeeded the Almohads. To the Marinids, madrasas played a part in bolstering the political legitimacy of their dynasty. They used this patronage to encourage the loyalty of Fes's influential but fiercely independent religious elites and also to portray themselves to the general population as protectors and promoters of orthodox Sunni Islam. The madrasas also served to train the scholars and elites who operated their state's bureaucracy.

The Saffarin Madrasa, along with other nearby madrasas like the al-Attarine and the Mesbahiyya, was built in close proximity to the al-Qarawiyyin, the main center of learning in Fes and historically the most important intellectual center of Morocco. The madrasas played a supporting role to the Qarawiyyin; unlike the mosque, they provided accommodations for students, particularly those coming from outside of Fes. Many of these students were poor, seeking sufficient education to gain a higher position in their home towns, and the madrasas provided them with basic necessities such as lodging and bread. However, the madrasas were also teaching institutions in their own right and offered their own courses, with some Islamic scholars making their reputation by teaching at certain madrasas. They also served as centers of their communities and hosted ceremonies.

=== History of the Saffarin Madrasa ===
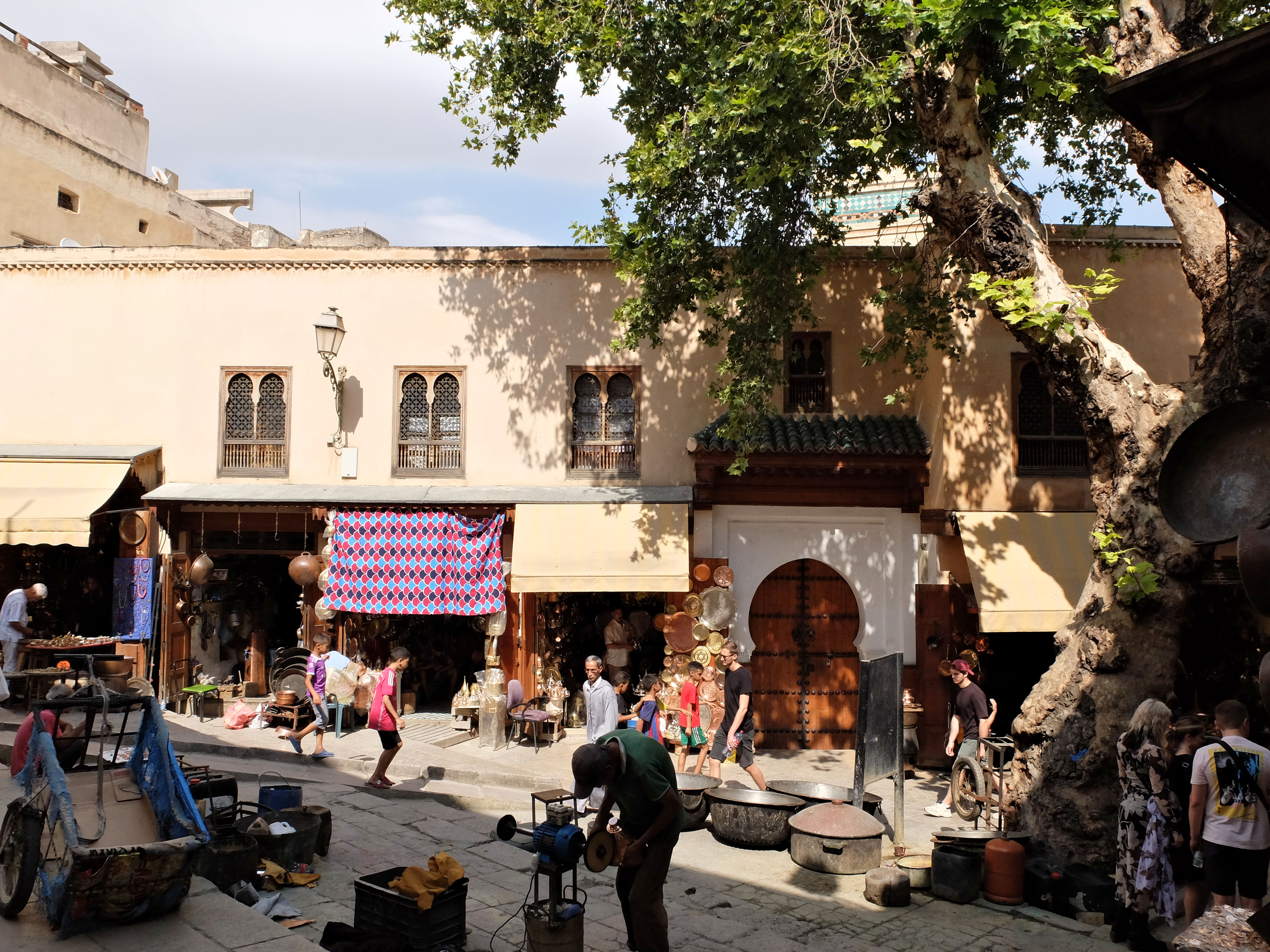
View of the madrasa's entrance on Saffarin Square

The Saffarin Madrasa was the first one of its kind to be built by the Marinids. It was completed in 1271 by commission of Sultan Abu Ya'qub Yusuf, who was also notable for his creation of Fes el-Jdid (the new citadel of Fez and capital of Morocco). The madrasa is sometimes called the Madrasa Ya'qubiyya, after his name. The 14th-century historian Al-Jazna'i recounts that when the madrasa was built there was a controversy about the qibla alignment of its prayer hall, which was different from that of the nearby Qarawiyyin Mosque.

Over the centuries, the madrasas in the area around the al-Qarawiyyin also became known for each housing students from particular regions of Morocco. Those staying at the Saffarin Madrasa were generally from nearby Zerhoun, from the northern region of Beni Zerwal, and from the southern region of Sous.

In the 18th century the Mohammadia Madrasa was built next to the Saffarin Madrasa as an annex to house more students. It covers an area of 752 square meters and also features two levels of rooms centered around a long courtyard.

In the 1930s and 1940s the Place Seffarin and many surrounding buildings were renovated. The adjoining Mohammadia Madrasa was also renovated and expanded on the initiative of Mohammed V between 1935 and 1942. By the late 20th century the madrasa was in a relatively dilapidated state and had lost much of its decoration. It underwent some restoration in the 1960s and was reopened to students of the Qarawiyyin University. More recently, on the initiative of King Mohammed VI it underwent a major restoration that was completed in 2016-2017, at the cost of 8 million dirhams. The madrasa is still in use as housing for the students of the al-Qarawiyyin University.

== Architecture ==
=== Layout ===
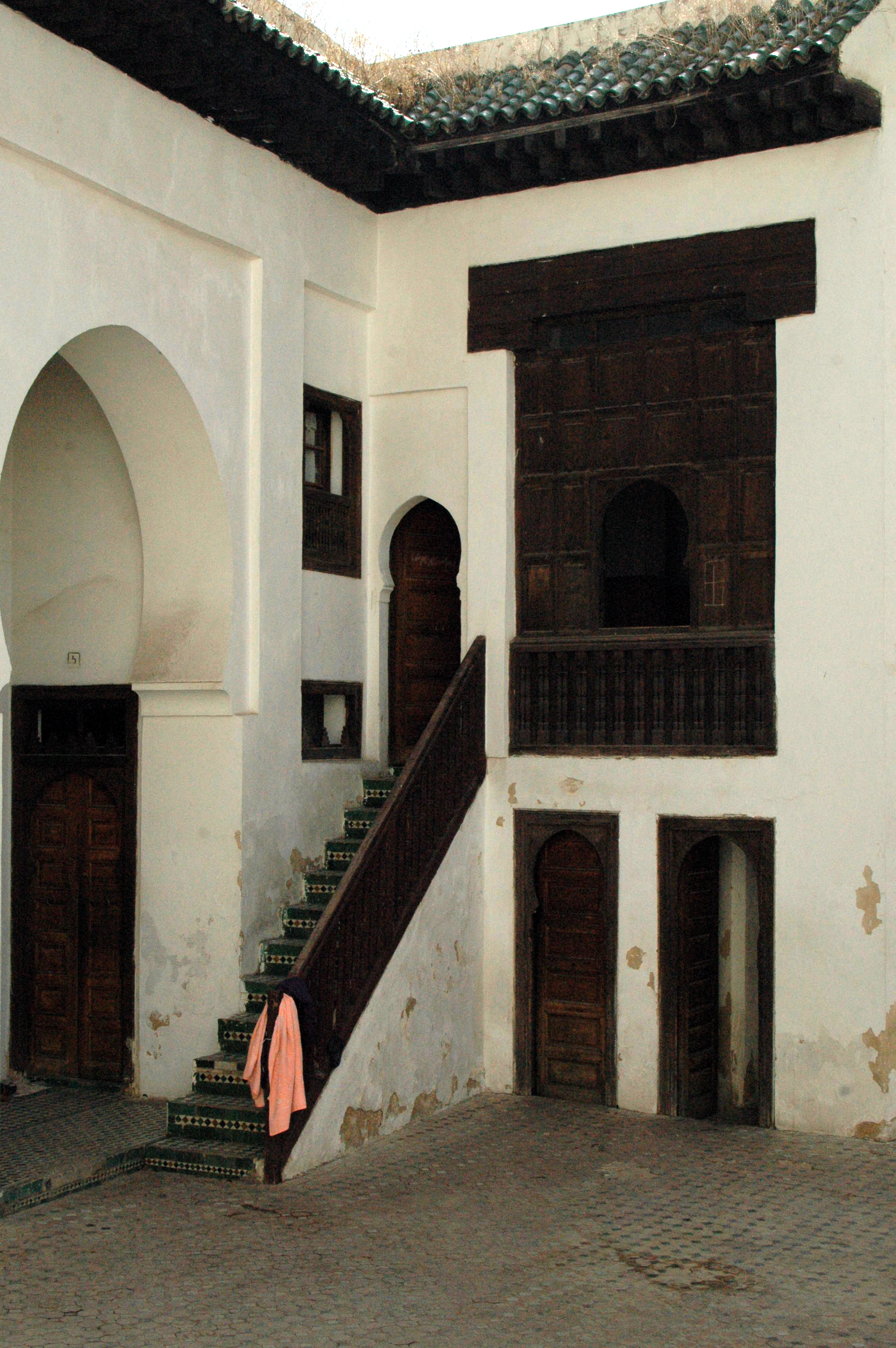
Doorway and part of the gallery around the courtyard (prior to recent restoration)

The madrasa is entered via a bent passage which leads directly to a large rectangular main courtyard (sahn), at the center of which is a large rectangular water basin. Around this courtyard are a multitude of rooms which serve as sleeping quarters for the students, distributed across two stories. A small brick minaret stands next to the entrance.

On the courtyard's eastern side, opposite the entrance, is a large high room which acted as a prayer hall (like a small mosque or oratory). The room is covered by a pyramidal roof and contains a mihrab. However, the overall orientation of the madrasa and the alignment street façade is different from that of the qibla (direction of prayer), therefore the prayer hall is not aligned with the rest of the courtyard and stands at an angle to it.

On the north side of the prayer hall (and following the same orientation), and reached via a long corridor from the corner of the main courtyard, is the madrasa's ablutions hall (Arabic: ميضأة, romanized: mida'a). It consists of a smaller courtyard with a central water basin, around which are many small rooms containing latrines. This ablutions hall shares the same alignment as that of the prayer hall, rather than the rest of the madrasa.

=== Decoration ===
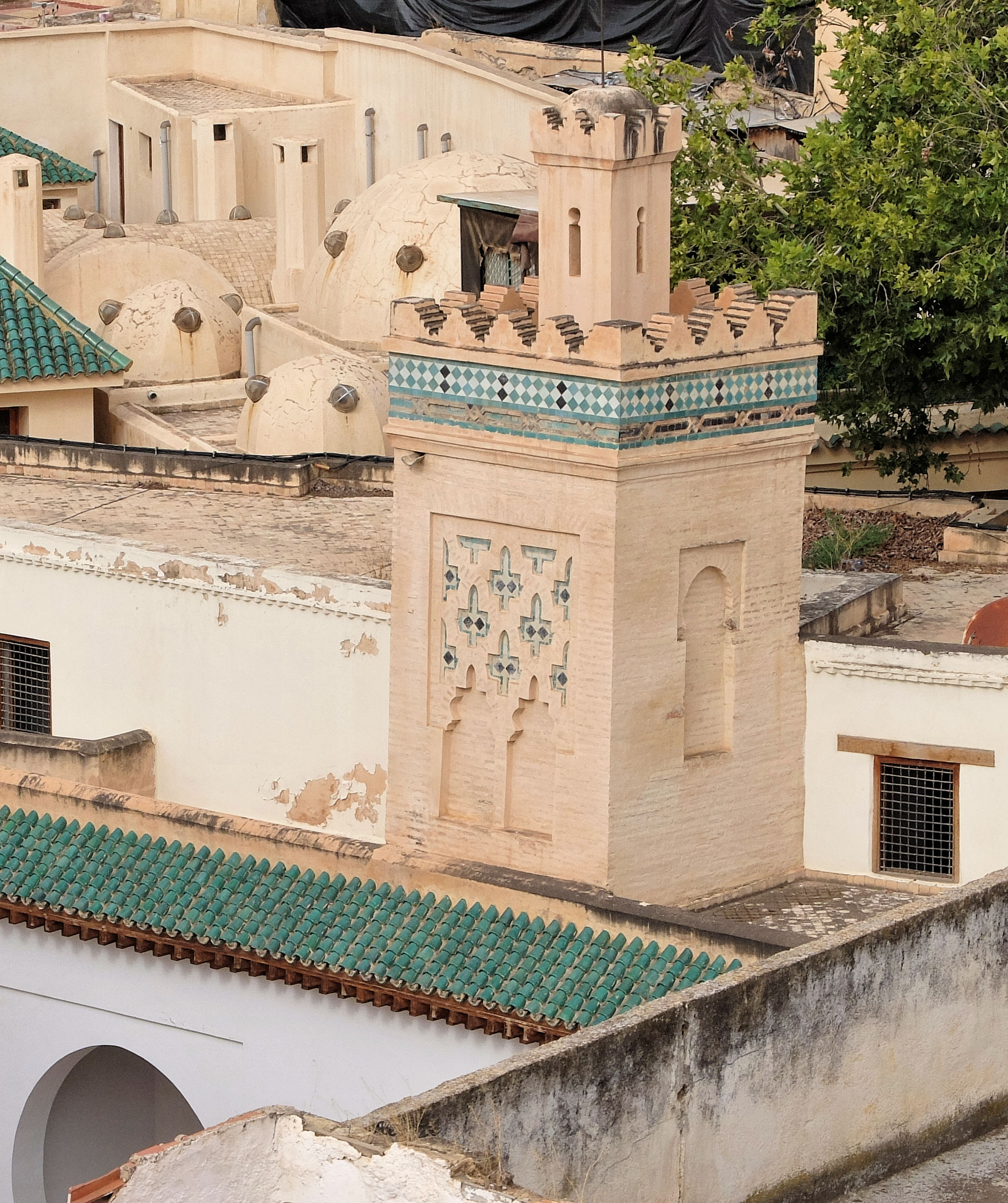
The minaret

The madrasa has lost most of its decoration, but parts of it have survived, especially in the prayer hall. The stucco decoration of the prayer hall, concentrated on the upper walls, was restored during the most recent restoration of the building. It features horizontal bands of ornate Arabic inscriptions, a frieze of geometric motifs, and a band of blind arches and windows filled with other arabesque or geometric motifs. Inside the mihrab niche is a muqarnas cupola. The large pyramidal wooden ceiling of the room is also ornate. The joists of the ceiling are arranged to form their own geometric patterns and the central part of the ceiling culminates in a flat area with a carved muqarnas cupola in the middle and four smaller ones at the corners. Additional motifs painted on the wood were renewed during the recent restoration.

A fragment of stucco decoration has also been preserved above the entrance to the madrasa, on the courtyard side. Art historian Xavier Salmon suggests that this may have originally been part of a decorative composition framing the entrance arch, similar to what is seen in some mosques of the city. The small minaret is also decorated with blind horseshoe arches around its windows and a band of simple polychrome ceramic tiles around its top, while its eastern façade (facing the courtyard) is covered with a darj-wa-ktaf or interlacing arch motif.

=== Comparison with later madrasa architecture ===
The madrasa presents some early features which reappeared in later Moroccan madrasas but is also different from the others in important respects due to it being one of the Marinid architects' earliest attempts to conceive of a purpose-built madrasa building (which did not yet have precedents in Morocco). Both the bent entrance and the central courtyard with a water basin were common features of later madrasas. However, the awkward arrangement of the prayer hall and other elements of the floor plan, as well as the fact that the sleeping quarters of the students opened directly onto the courtyard on the ground floor, are all aspects which were revised and not repeated in the design of later madrasas. The design of later Marinid madrasas in the 14th century witnessed a refinement which emphasized greater symmetry and regularity in their layout, as well as presenting a more unified decorative program.

The presence of a minaret was also not a feature of other madrasas (with the exception of the Bou Inania Madrasa which had the special status of a Friday mosque), as the prayer hall of a madrasa was reserved for its students and was not open to the public like a full mosque. Jonathan Bloom, remarking that the minaret does not appear to be built from the ground level, suggests that it was likely added some time after the original construction of the madrasa.

== See also ==
- Madrasa of Fes el-Jdid
- Sahrij Madrasa
