= Architecture of Fez =

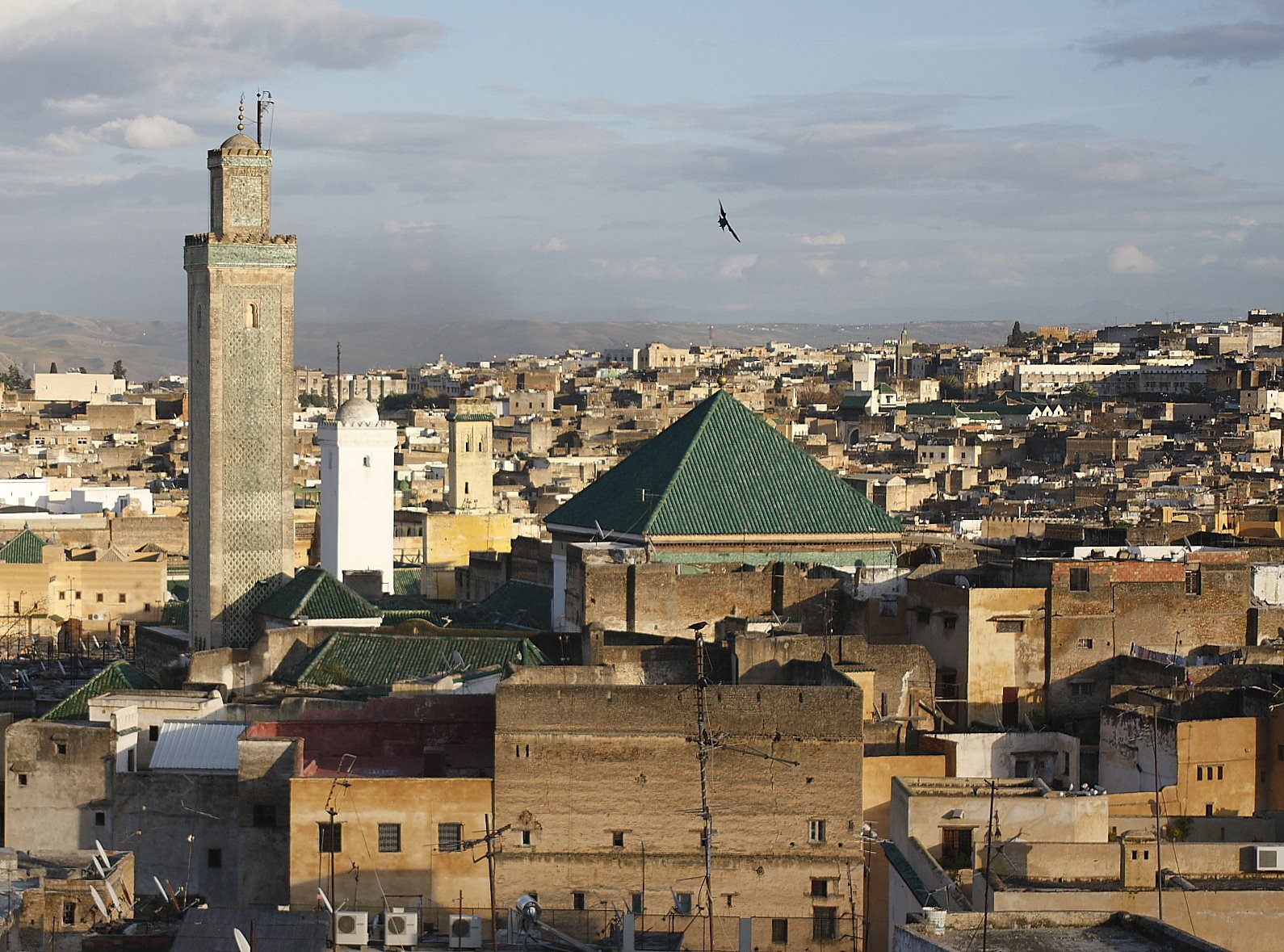
Fes el-Bali, with the minarets of the Zawiya of Moulay Idris II and the Qarawiyyin Mosque visible

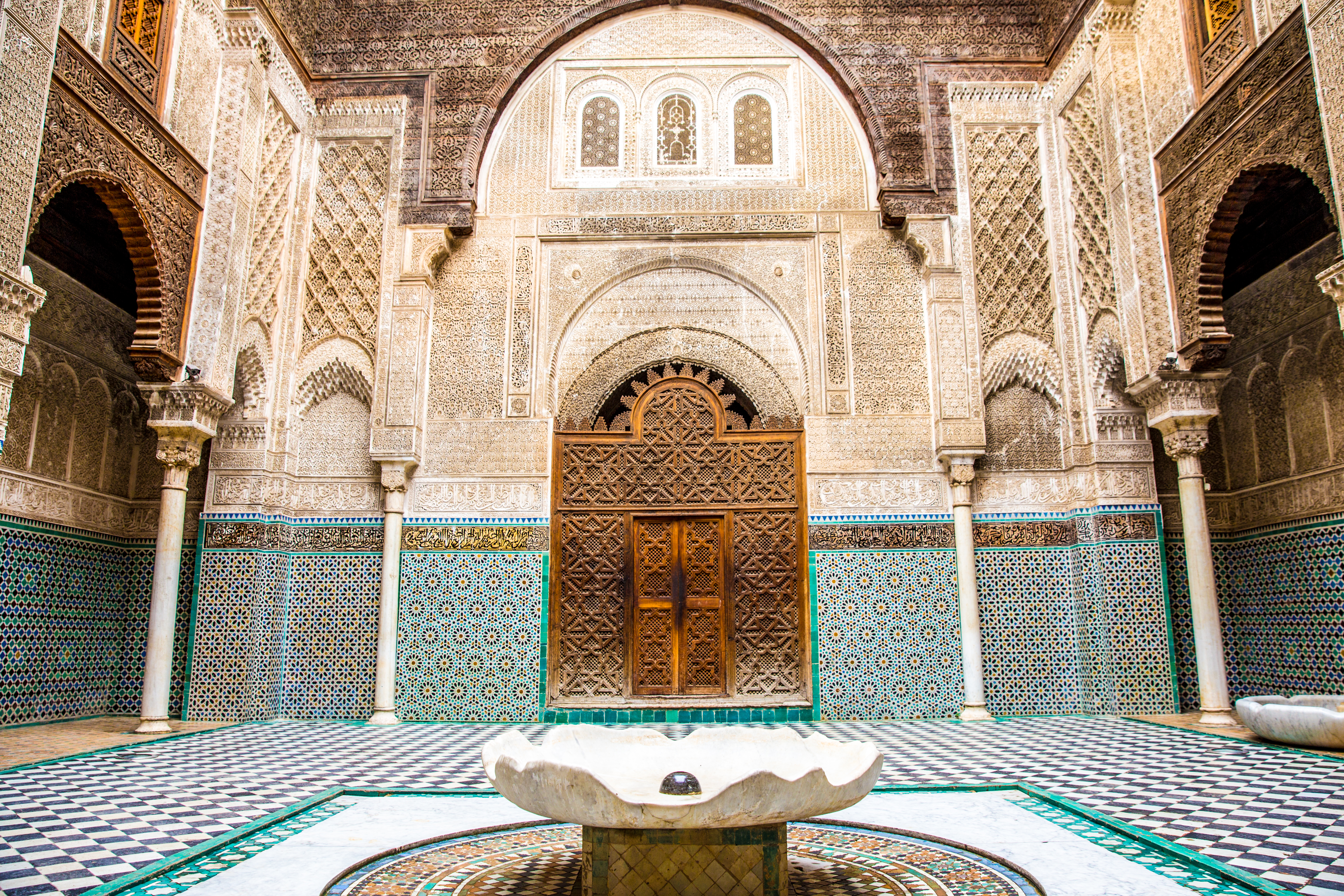
The Al-Attarine Madrasa in Fez epitomises many of the customary features of Moroccan architecture

The architecture of Fez, Morocco, reflects the wider trends of Moroccan architecture dating from the city's foundation in the late 8th century and up to modern times. The old city (medina) of Fes, consisting of Fes el-Bali and Fes el-Jdid, is notable for being an exceptionally well-preserved medieval North African city and is classified as a UNESCO World Heritage Site. A large number of historic monuments from different periods still exist in it today, including mosques, madrasas, synagogues, hammams (bathhouses), souqs (markets), funduqs (caravanserais), defensive walls, city gates, historic houses, and palaces.

== History ==
=== Early history (9th-10th centuries) ===
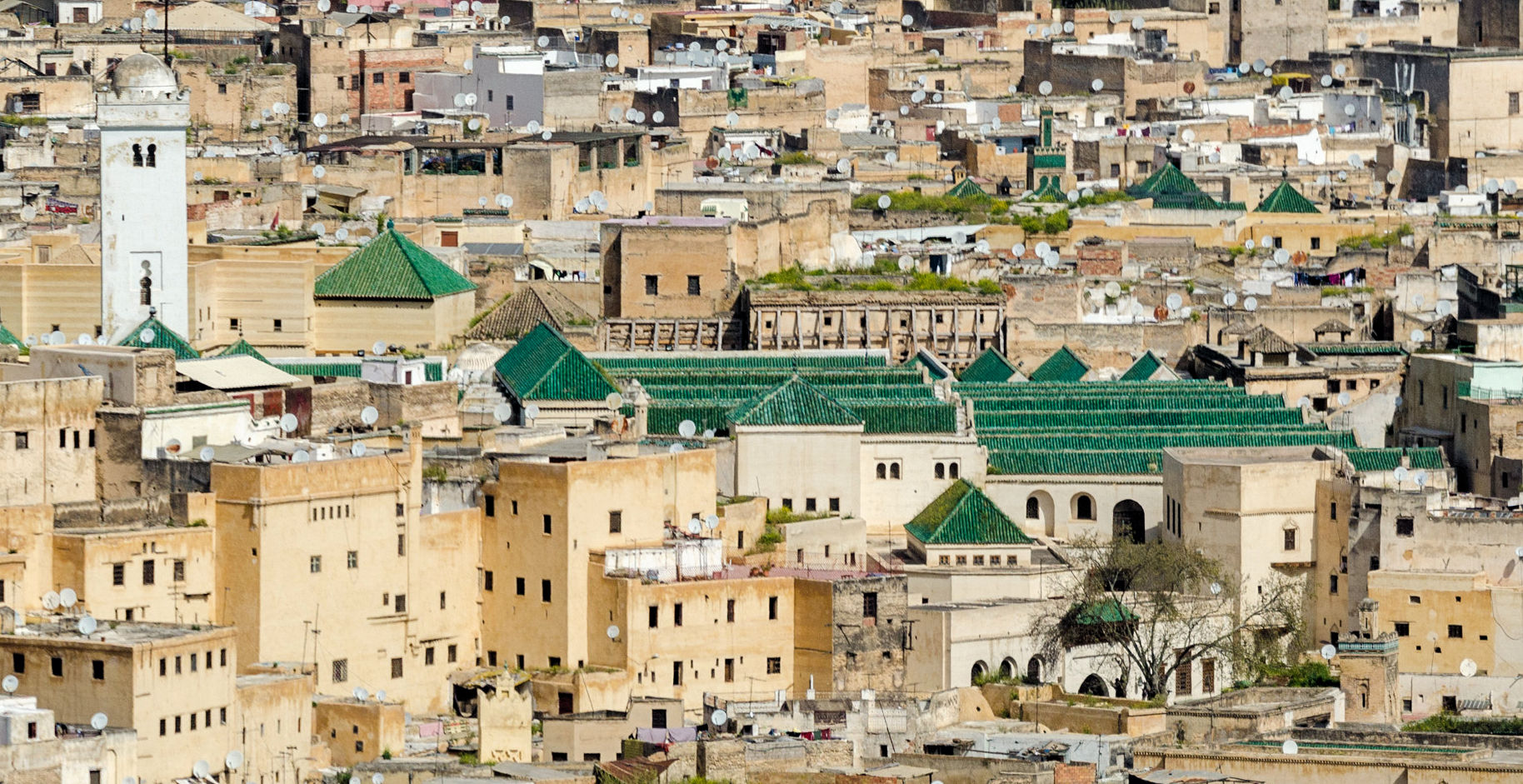
Skyline view of the Al-Qarawiyyin Mosque in the Qarawiyyin Quarter (originally Al-'Aliya) of Fez. The mosque was founded in 859 but was repeatedly expanded and modified, becoming a major center of learning. Its green-tiled roofs and its white minaret (left) are visible.

The city was founded on a bank of the Oued Fes (Fez River) by Idris I in 789, founder of the Idrisid dynasty. His son, Idris II (808), built a settlement on the opposing river bank in 809 and moved his capital here from Walili (Volubilis). These settlements would soon develop into two walled and largely autonomous sites, often in conflict with one another: Madinat Fas and Al-'Aliya. The early population was composed mostly of Berbers, along with hundreds of Arab warriors from Kairouan who made up Idris II's entourage. The first mosques of the city were the Mosque of the Sharifs (or Shurafa Mosque) and the Mosque of the Sheikhs (or al-Anouar Mosque); however, they no longer exist in their original form. The Mosque of the Sharifs became the burial site of Idris II upon his death and later evolved into the Zawiya of Moulay Idris II that exists today, while the al-Anouar Mosque has left only minor remnants.

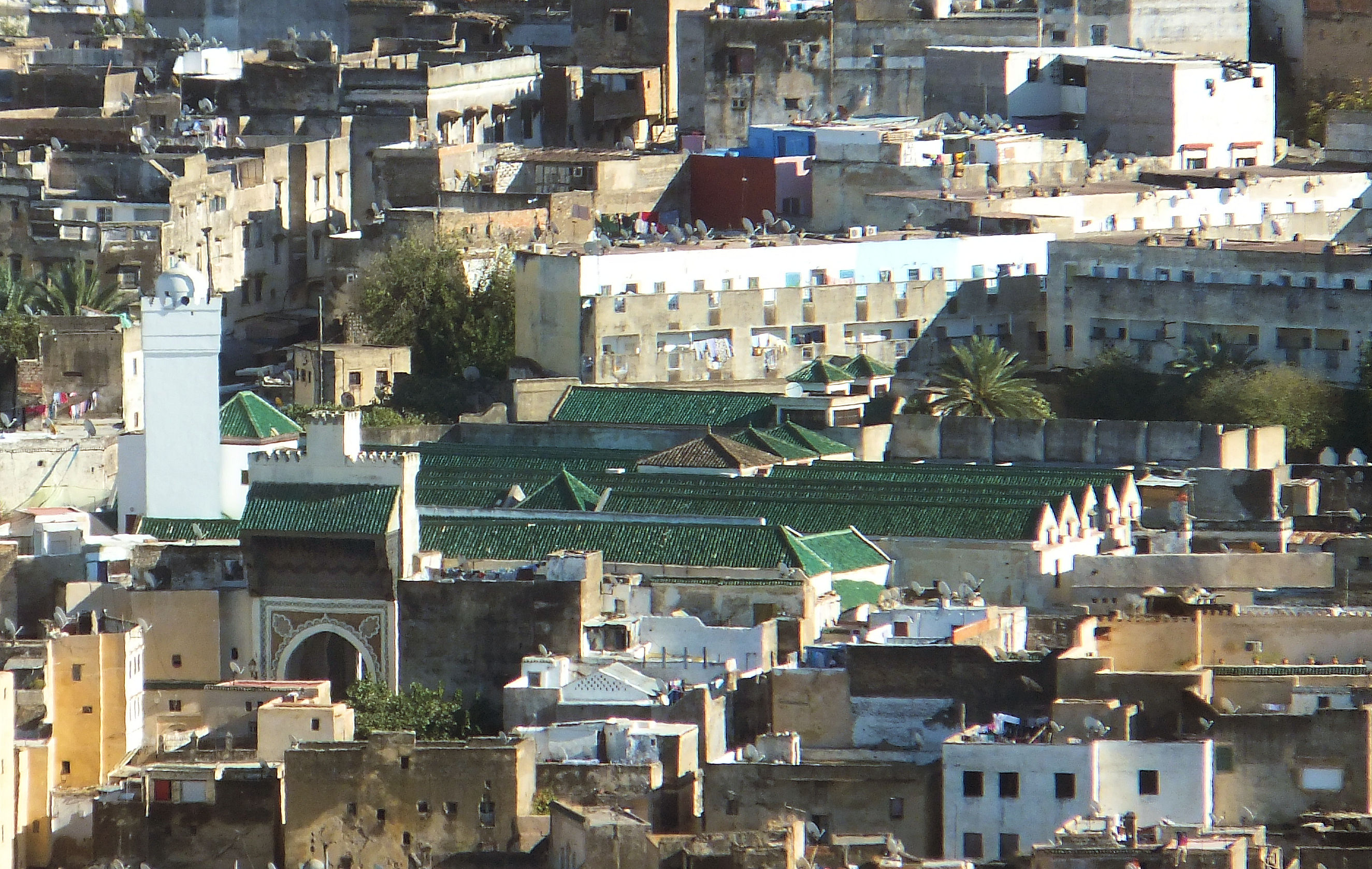
Skyline view of the Al-Andalusiyyin Mosque in the Andalusian Quarter (originally Madinat Fas) of Fez. The mosque was founded in 859 but was later expanded, including with the addition of a white minaret (left) in the 10th century.

Arab emigration to Fez increased afterwards, including Andalusi families of mixed Arab and Iberian descent who were expelled from Córdoba in 817–818 after a rebellion against the Al-Hakam I, as well as Arab families banned from Kairouan (modern Tunisia) after another rebellion in 824. These immigrants gave the city its Arabic character. The Andalusians settled mostly in Madinat Fas, while the Tunisians found their home in Al-'Aliya. These two waves of immigrants would subsequently give their name to the sites 'Adwat Al-Andalus and 'Adwat al-Qarawiyyin. Both the Qarawiyyin Mosque and the Andalusiyyin Mosque are believed to have been founded around this period, in 859. The decline of the Idrisid dynasty afterward resulted in Fez changing hands between various empires and local factions in the 10th century.

The earliest surviving Islamic-era monuments in Fez, the al-Qarawiyyin and Andalusi mosques, were built in the hypostyle form and made early use of the horseshoe arch. These reflected influences from major early monuments like the Great Mosque of Kairouan and the Great Mosque of Córdoba. In the 10th century much of northern Morocco, including Fez, came directly within the sphere of influence of the Umayyad Caliphate of Córdoba, with competition from the Fatimid Caliphate further east. Early contributions to Moroccan architecture from this period include expansions to the Qarawiyyin and Andalusi mosques and the addition of their square-shafted minarets, anticipating the later standard form of Moroccan minarets.

=== Almoravid and Almohad era (11th-13th centuries) ===
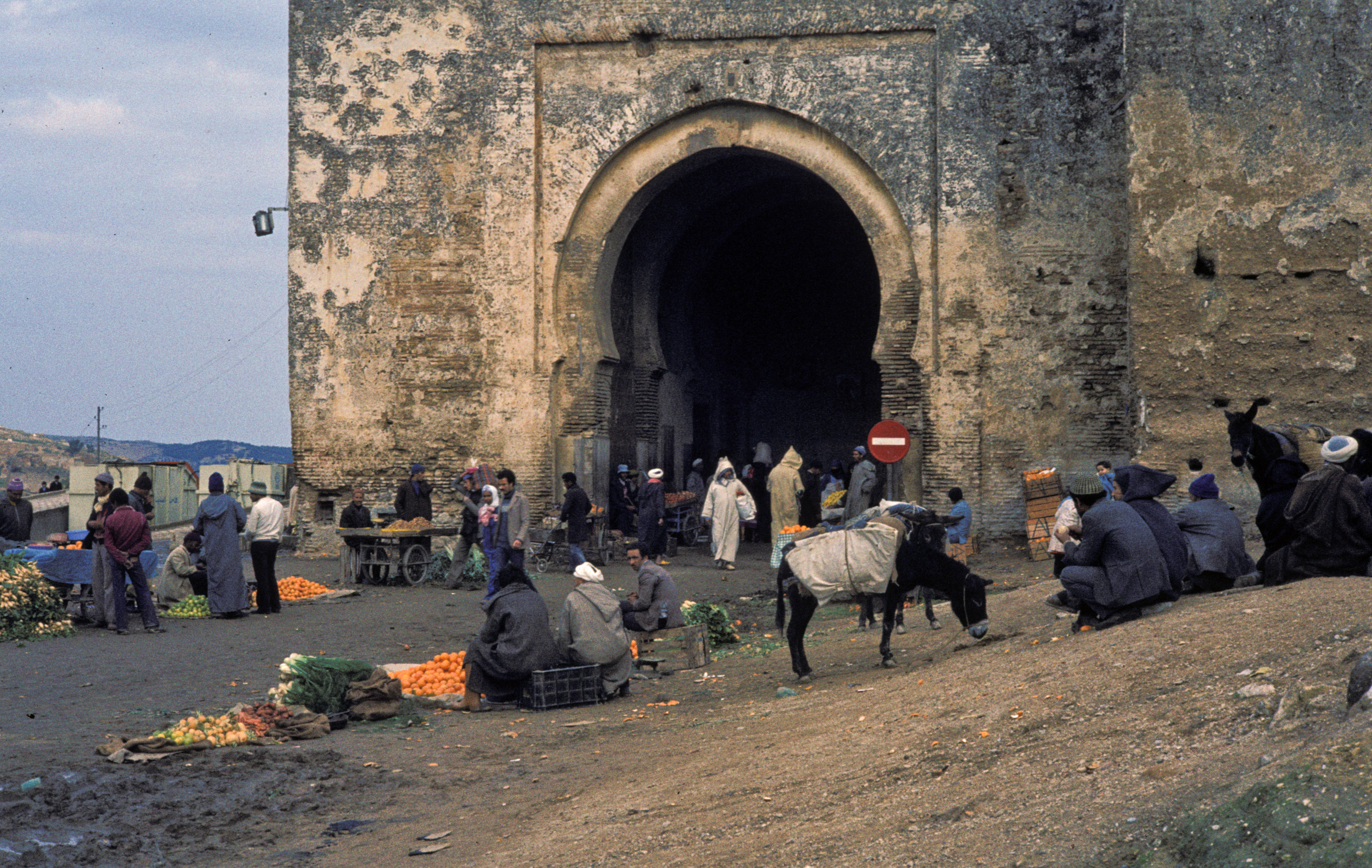
Bab Mahrouk, the Almohad-era western gate of the city (photographed in 1982)

The rise of the Almoravids in the 11th century brought about the foundation of a new capital at Marrakesh to the south, and the Almohads after them also kept Marrakesh as their center of power. Nonetheless, Fes remained the second city of their empires. The city's merchant economic activity and its intellectual influence continued to grow. The Almoravids unified the two cities of Madinat Fas and Al-Aliya for the first time into one large city with a single set of walls. They also expanded the Al-Qarawiyyin Mosque, which functioned as a religious centre and also educational institution. When the Almohad leader Abd al-Mu'min besieged and conquered the city in 1145, he demolished the city's fortifications as punishment for its resistance. However, due to Fes's continuing economic and military importance, the Almohad caliph Ya'qub al-Mansur ordered the reconstruction of the ramparts. The walls were completed by his successor Muhammad al-Nasir in 1204, giving them their definitive shape and establishing the perimeter of Fes el-Bali to this day.

The Almoravid-Almohad period is considered one of the most formative stages of Moroccan and Moorish architecture, establishing many of the forms and motifs that were refined in subsequent centuries. The Almoravids adopted the architectural developments of al-Andalus, such as the complex interlacing arches of the Great Mosque in Cordoba and of the Aljaferia palace in Zaragoza, while also introducing new ornamental techniques from the east such as muqarnas ("stalactite" or "honeycomb" carvings). Outside of Fes, the Almohad Kutubiyya and Tinmal mosques are often considered the prototypes of later Moroccan mosques. Likewise, the monumental minarets (e.g. the Kutubiyya minaret, the Giralda of Seville, and the Hassan Tower of Rabat) and ornamental gateways (e.g. Bab Agnaou in Marrakesh, and Bab Oudaia and Bab er-Rouah in Rabat) of the Almohad period also established the overall decorative schemes that became recurrent in these architectural elements thenceforth. The minaret of the Kasbah Mosque of Marrakech was particularly influential and set a style that was repeated, with minor elaborations, in the following Marinid period.

=== Marinid period and golden age (13th-15th centuries) ===
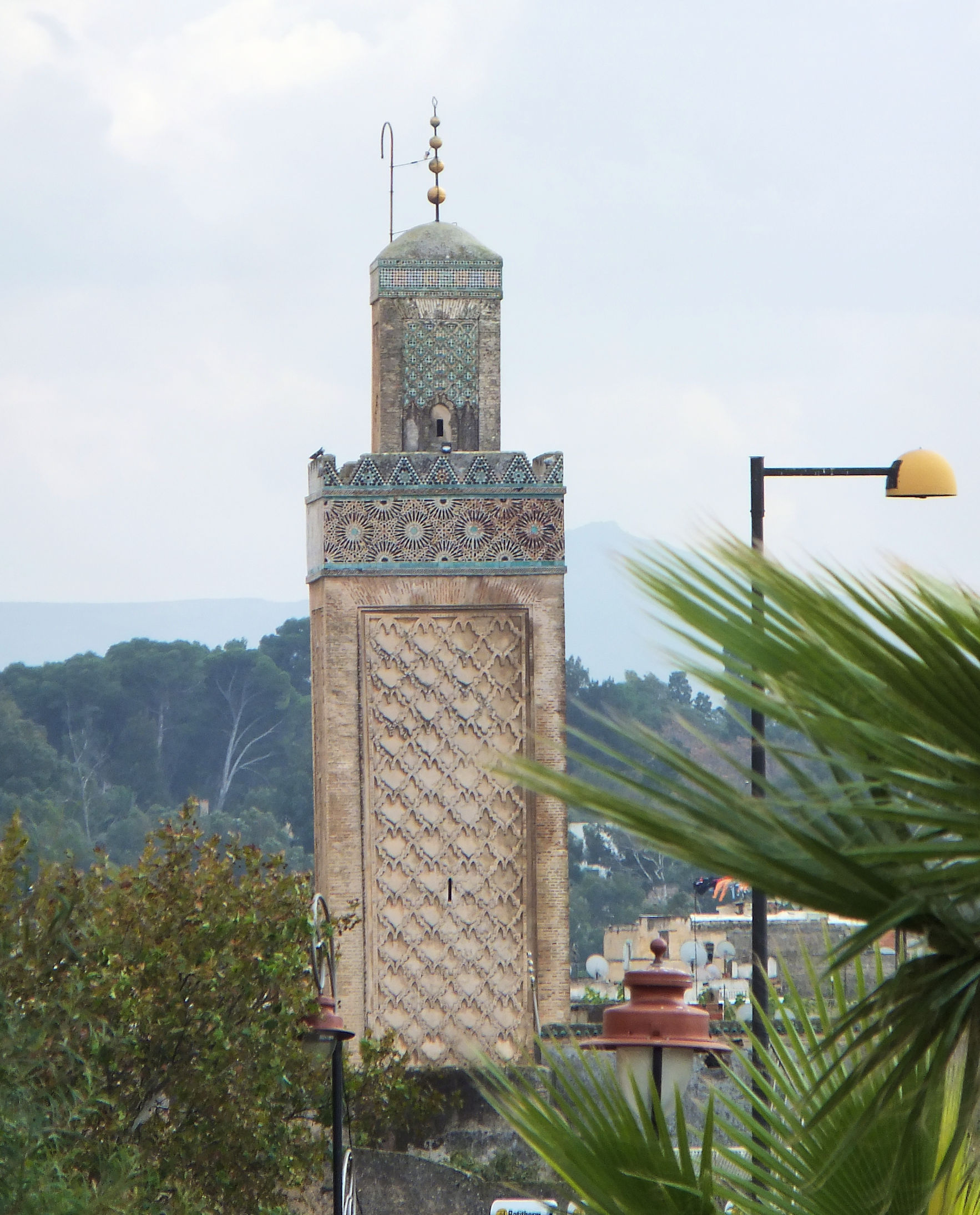
The minaret of the Grand Mosque of Fes el-Jdid, built by the Marinids in the 13th century

Fez regained its political status and became recognised as the capital during the Marinid dynasty between the 13th and 15th centuries. In 1276 the Marinid sultan Abu Yusuf Ya'qub built an entirely new administrative city or royal citadel to the west of the old city, on higher ground overlooking it. This became known as Fes el-Jdid ("New Fes"), and included the royal palace of the sultans (Dar al-Makhzen), the administrative offices of the state, and the headquarters of the army. Fes el-Jdid had its own set of fortified walls and gates. Most of its outer perimeter was protected by a set of double walls; a tall inner wall with heavy square towers at regular intervals and a smaller outer wall with minor towers. Its northern entrance, at the beginning of the road to Meknes, consisted of a fortified bridge (now the Old Mechouar) over the Oued Fes. Inside, the city was further subdivided into different districts, some of which, including the Dar al-Makhzen, had walls and gates separating them from the others. Another district, initially known as Hims and later converted into the Jewish Mellah, was also added to the south. In 1287 Sultan Abu Ya'qub Yusuf (son of Abu Yusuf Ya'qub) created a vast pleasure garden, known as al-Mosara, to the north, just outside the city but encompassed by its own protective wall. The gardens were watered via an aqueduct which drew water from the Oued Fes through an enormous noria (a type of water wheel), approximately 26 meters in diameter, which was located on the west side of Bab Dekkakin. Although the gardens and the water wheel have since disappeared, traces of the former aqueduct are visible in the western wall of the New Mechouar today and also in the large octagonal towers of Bab Segma, one of the former gates to the garden.

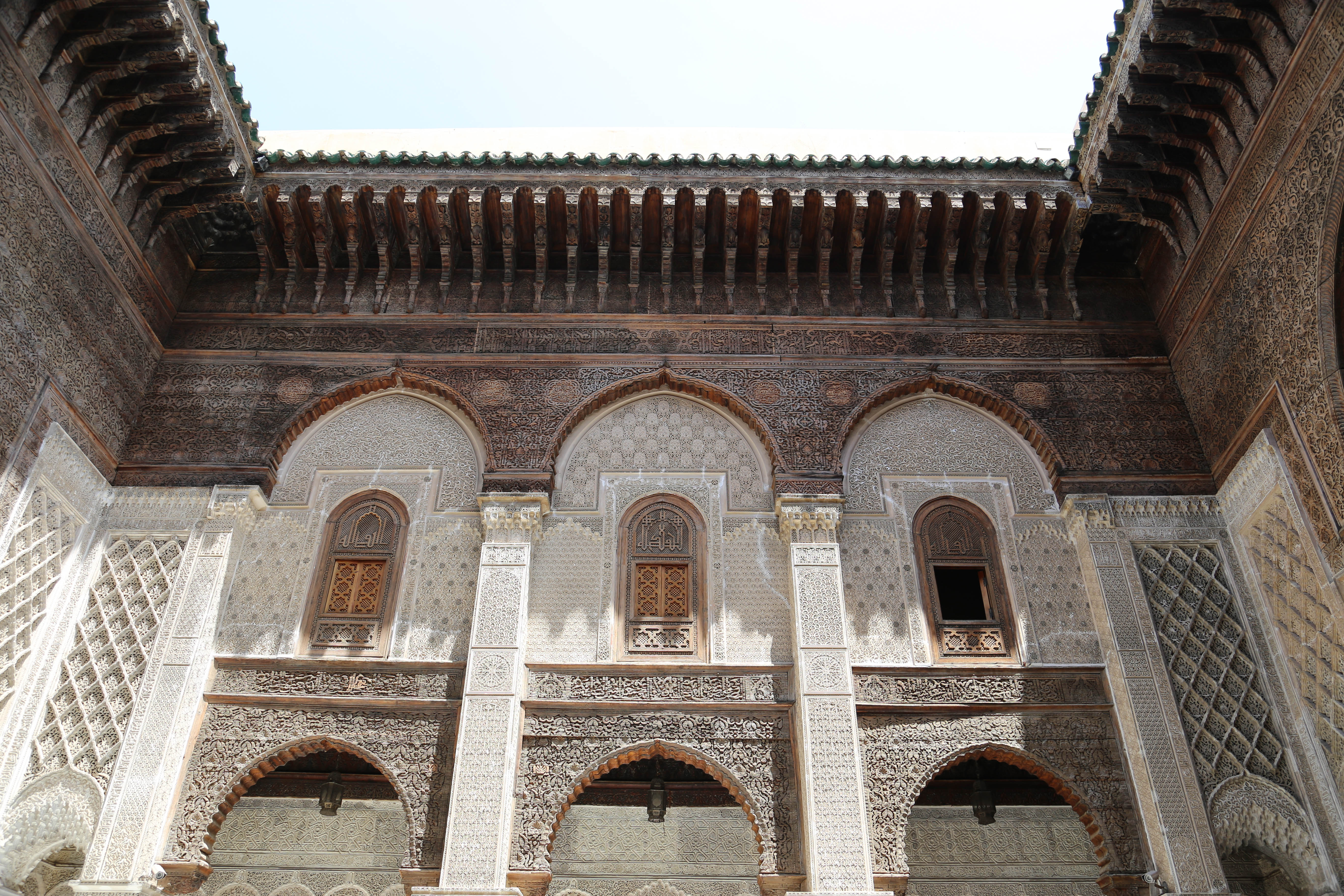
Al-Attarine Madrasa, built by the Marinids in the 14th century

The Marinids were also important in further refining the artistic legacy established by their predecessors. They built monuments with increasingly intricate and extensive decoration, particularly in wood and stucco. They were also the first to deploy extensive use of zellij (mosaic tilework in complex geometric patterns). Notably, they were the first to build madrasas, a type of institution which originated in Iran and had spread west. The madrasas of Fes, such as the Bou Inania, al-Attarine, and as-Sahrij madrasas, are considered among the greatest architectural works of this period. While mosque architecture largely followed the Almohad model, one noted change was the progressive increase in the size of the sahn or courtyard, which was previously a minor element of the floor plan but which eventually, in the subsequent Saadian period, became as large as the main prayer hall, and sometimes larger.

The architectural style under the Marinids was also very closely related to that found in the Emirate of Granada, in Spain, under the contemporary Nasrid dynasty. The decoration of the famous Alhambra is thus reminiscent of what was built in Fes at the same time. When Granada was conquered in 1492 by Catholic Spain and the last Muslim realm of al-Andalus came to an end, many of the remaining Spanish Muslims (and Jews) fled to Morocco and North Africa, resulting in another increase of Andalusian influence in Fez during subsequent generations.

=== Decline and development under the Saadians and Alawis (16th-19th centuries) ===
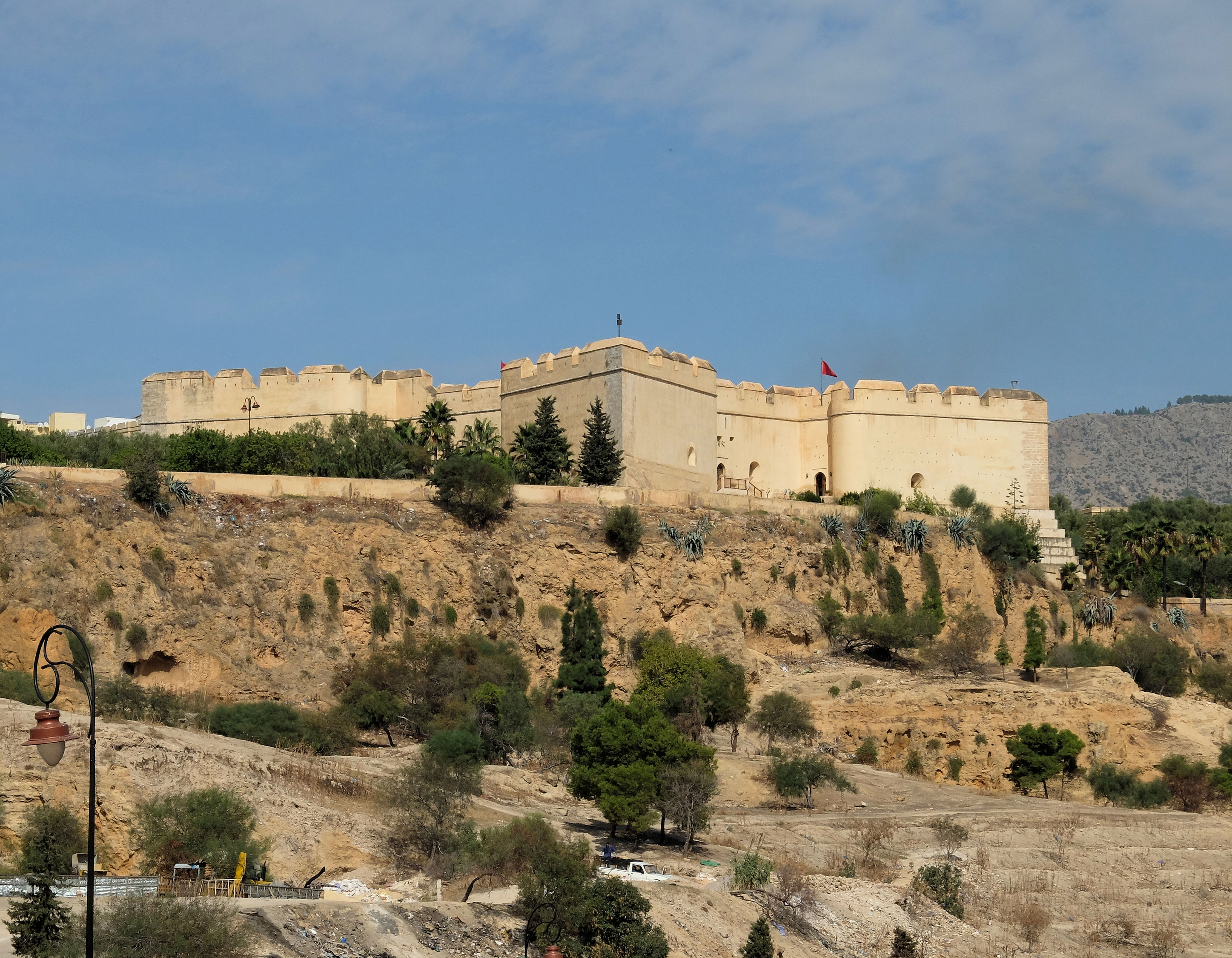
Borj Nord, a gunpowder-age fortress built in the 16th century by the Saadians

After the decline of the Marinid dynasty, Fes went into a mixed era of decline and occasional prosperity under the Saadians and Alawis. The Saadians, who used Marrakesh again as their capital, did not lavish much attention on Fes, with the exception of the ornate ablutions pavilions added to the Qarawiyyin Mosque's courtyard during their time. Perhaps as a result of persistent tensions with the city's inhabitants, the Saadians built a number of new forts and bastions around the city which appear to have been aimed at keeping control over the local population. They were mostly located on higher ground overlooking Fes el-Bali, from which they would have been easily able to bombard the city with canons. These include the Kasbah Tamdert, just inside the city walls near Bab Ftouh, and the forts of Borj Nord (Borj al-Shamali) on the hills to the north, Borj Sud (Borj al-Janoub) on the hills to the south, and the Borj Sheikh Ahmed to the west, at a point in Fes el-Jdid's walls that was closest to Fes el-Bali. These were built in the late 16th century, mostly by Sultan Ahmad al-Mansur. Two other bastions, Borj Twil and Borj Sidi Bou Nafa', were also built along Fes el-Jdid's walls south of Borj Sheikh Ahmed. The Borj Nord, Borj Sud, and these bastions (sometimes referred to as the bastioun in Arabic) of Fes el-Jdid are the only fortifications in Fes to demonstrate clear European (most likely Portuguese) influence in their design, updated to serve as defenses in the age of gunpowder. Some of them may have been built with the help of Christian European prisoners of war from the Saadians' victory over Portuguese at the Battle of the Three Kings in 1578.

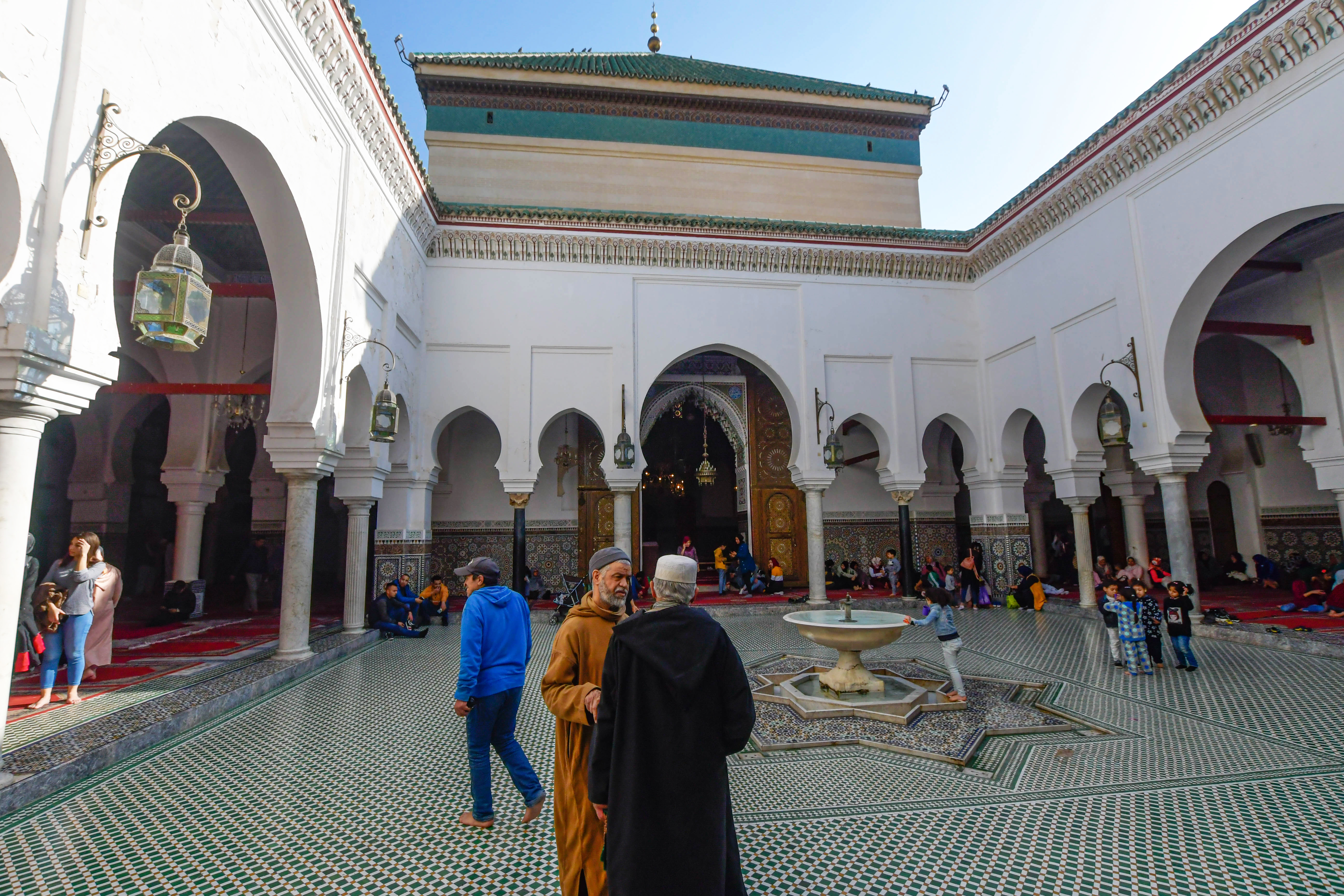
Zawiya of Moulay Idris II; the building today dates entirely from a reconstruction by Moulay Isma'il in the early 18th century and further additions under later Alawi' sultans

The founder of the Alawi dynasty, Moulay Rashid, took Fes in 1666 and made it his capital. He set about restoring the city after a long period of neglect. He built the Kasbah Cherarda (also known as the Kasbah al-Khemis) to the north of Fes el-Jdid and of the Royal Palace in order to house a large part of his tribal troops. He also restored or rebuilt what became known as the Kasbah an-Nouar, which became the living quarters of his followers from the Tafilalt region (the Alawi dynasty's ancestral home). For this reason, the kasbah was also known as the Kasbah Filala ("Kasbah of the people from Tafilalt"). After Moulay Rashid's death Fes underwent another dark period. His successor, Moulay Isma'il, moved the capital to Meknes, though he did sponsor some major construction projects in Fez. Notably, he completely rebuilt the Zawiya of Moulay Idris II between 1717 and 1720, giving the building most of its present form.

From the reign of Moulay Muhammad ibn Abdallah onward Fez regained its power and prestige. The Alawis continued to rebuild or restore various monuments, as well as to expand the grounds of the Royal Palace a number of times. The final and most significant change to Fes's topography was made during the reign of Moulay Hasan I (1873-1894), who finally connected Fes el-Jdid and Fes el-Bali by building a walled corridor between them. Within this new corridor, between the two cities, were built new gardens and summer palaces used by the royals and the capital's high society, such as the Jnan Sbil Gardens and the Dar Batha palace. Moulay Hassan also expanded the old Royal Palace itself, extending its entrance up to the current location of the Old Mechouar while adding the New Mechouar, along with the Dar al-Makina, to the north. This had the consequence of also splitting the Moulay Abdallah neighbourhood to the northwest from the rest of Fes el-Jdid.

=== French colonial period and present-day (20th-21st centuries) ===
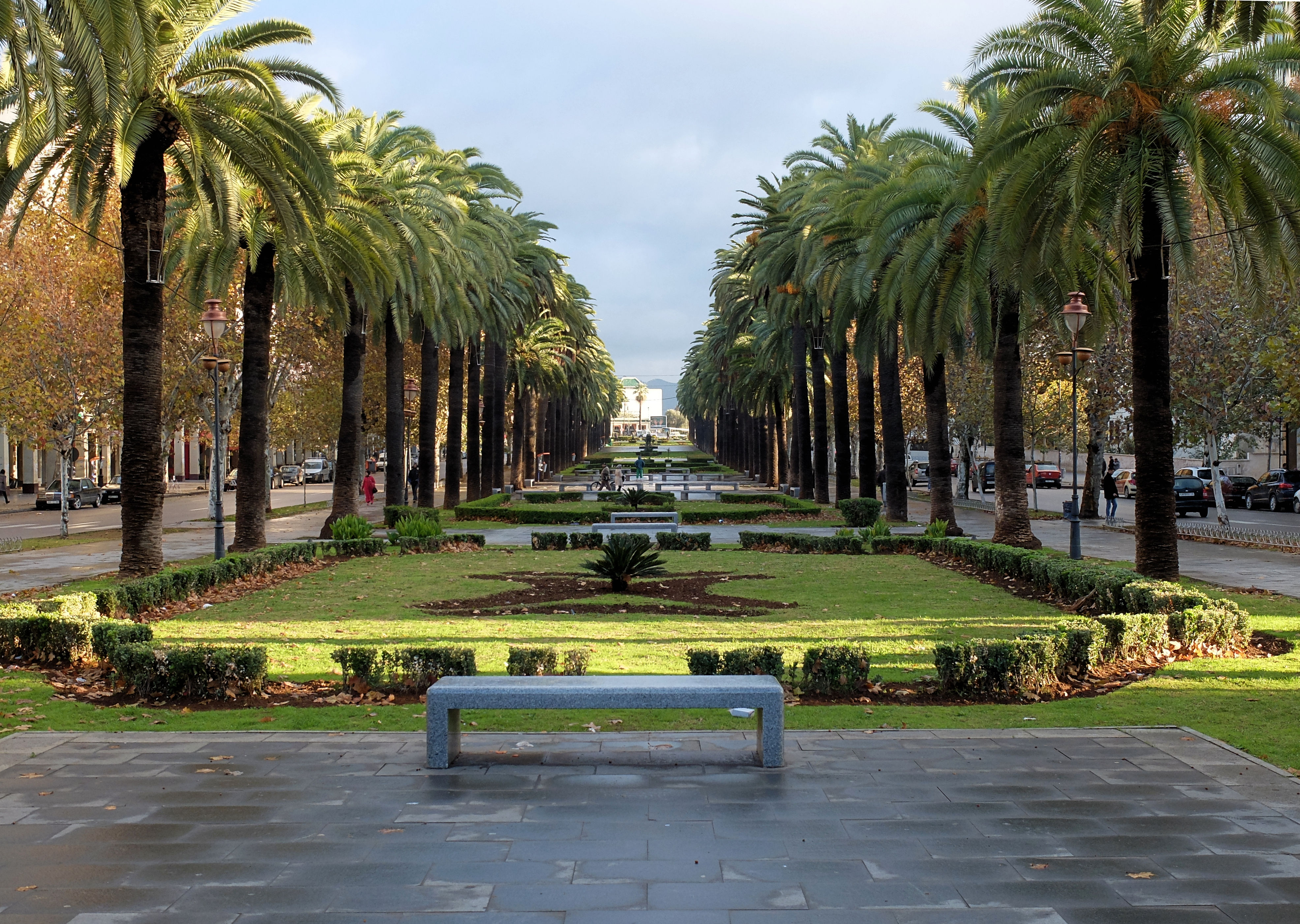
Avenue Hassan II (originally Avenue de France), the main boulevard of the Ville Nouvelle built by the French administration after 1912

In 1912 the Treaty of Fez was signed and Morocco became a French Protectorate, while Spain controlled the north of Morocco. The capital was moved again, this time to Rabat, which remains the capital to this day. Morocco regained independence from France and Spain in 1956.

Under the Protectorate administration, French resident general Hubert Lyautey appointed Henri Prost to oversee the urban development of cities. One important policy with long-term consequences was the decision to largely forego redevelopment of existing historic cities and to deliberately preserve them as sites of historic heritage, still known today as the "medinas". Instead, the French administration built new modern cities (the Villes Nouvelles or "New Cities") just outside the old cities, where European settlers largely resided with modern Western-style amenities. New building regulations maintained the country's pre-existing architectural features and balanced it with the rapid urbanization. Nonetheless, while this policy preserved historic monuments, it had other consequences in the long-term by stalling urban development in these heritage areas and causing housing shortages in some areas. It also suppressed local Moroccan architectural innovations, as for example in the medina of Fez where Moroccan residents where required to keep their houses – including any newly built houses – in conformity with what the French administration deemed to be the historic indigenous architecture. In some cases French officials removed or remodeled more recent pre-colonial Moroccan structures which had been visibly influenced by European styles in order to erase what they deemed as foreign or non-indigenous interference in Moroccan architecture, such as the Bab Campini gate (now known as Bab Chems), which was built in an Italianate style in the 19th century but was rebuilt by the French in a "Moorish" style.

In turn, French architects constructed buildings in the new cities that conformed to modern European functions and layouts but whose appearance was heavily blended with local Moroccan decorative motifs, resulting in a Mauresque or Neo-Moorish-style architecture. In some cases, the French also inserted Moroccan-looking structures in the fabric of the old cities, such as the Bab Bou Jeloud gate in Fes (completed in 1913) and the nearby Collège Moulay Idris (opened in 1918).

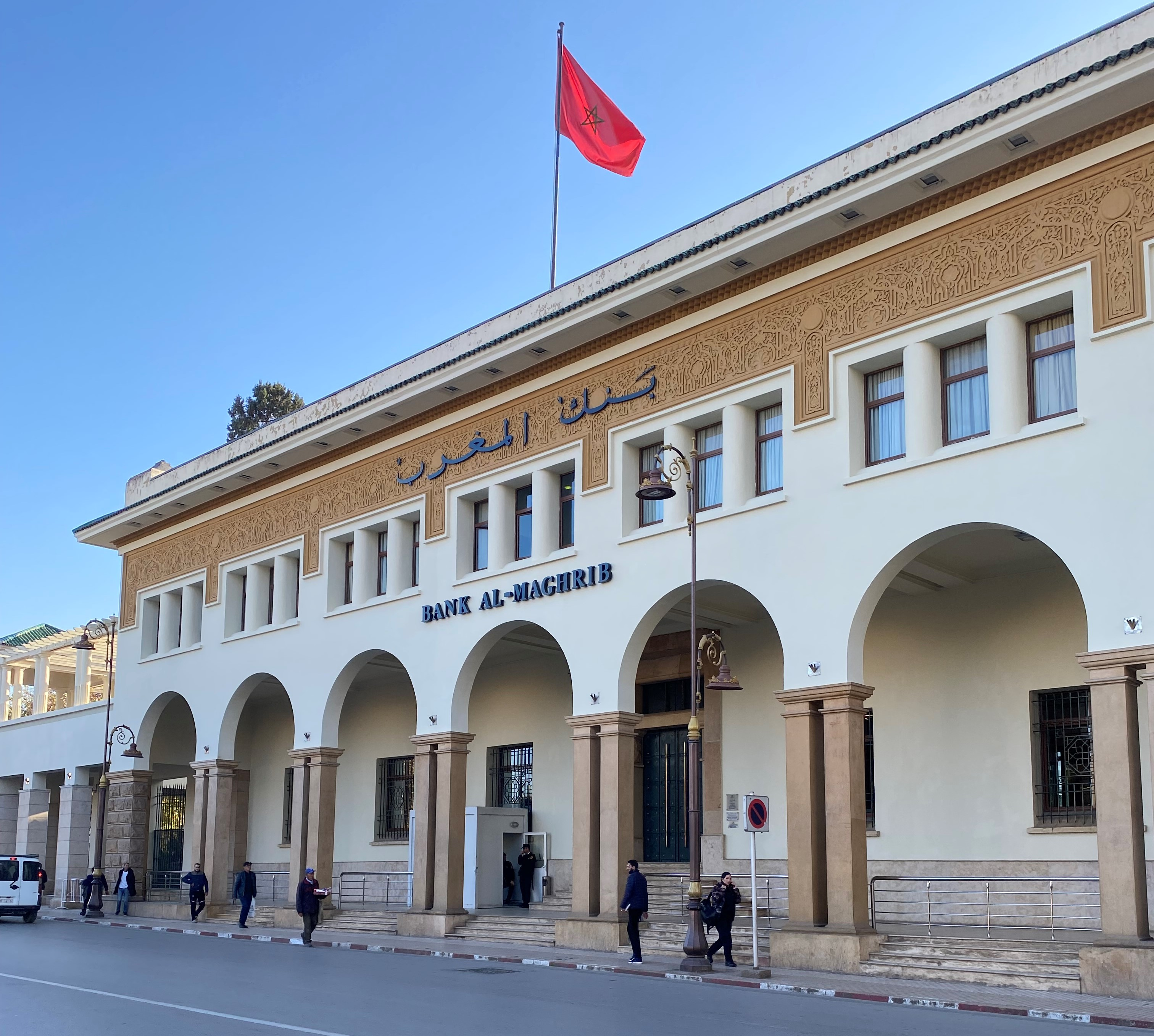
Bank al-Maghrib building in the Ville Nouvelle of Fez (1928–1931)

In the Ville Nouvelle of Fez, both French and Moroccan proprietors constructed new buildings that followed contemporary European tastes but often included traditional Moroccan features. Lyautey and the French authorities in Morocco were reticent to allow conspicuous orientalist constructions and pastiches of local Moroccan architecture. They discouraged what they saw as excessive néo-mauresque (Neo-Moorish) styles such as those seen in the architecture of French-controlled Algiers. Nonetheless, some public buildings erected in the Ville Nouvelle by French authorities still made use of this style. Many apartment blocks built in the 1910s and 1920s also demonstrated this trend. The first post office building, built in 1925 by architect Edmond Pauty, included local geometric motifs in its decorative details. The state bank building (the present-day Bank al-Maghrib branch), built between 1928 and 1931 by architect René Canu, includes a frieze of sculpted plaster featuring an interpretation of arabesque motifs. French authorities also encouraged builders to make use of local Moroccan labour and craftsmanship even if they weren't reproducing Moroccan motifs. For example, the main entrance of the building of the Court of First Instance (Tribunal de première instance), built in 1934, is decorated with zellij mosaic tilework of local Moroccan craftsmanship but depicting traditional French symbols of justice.

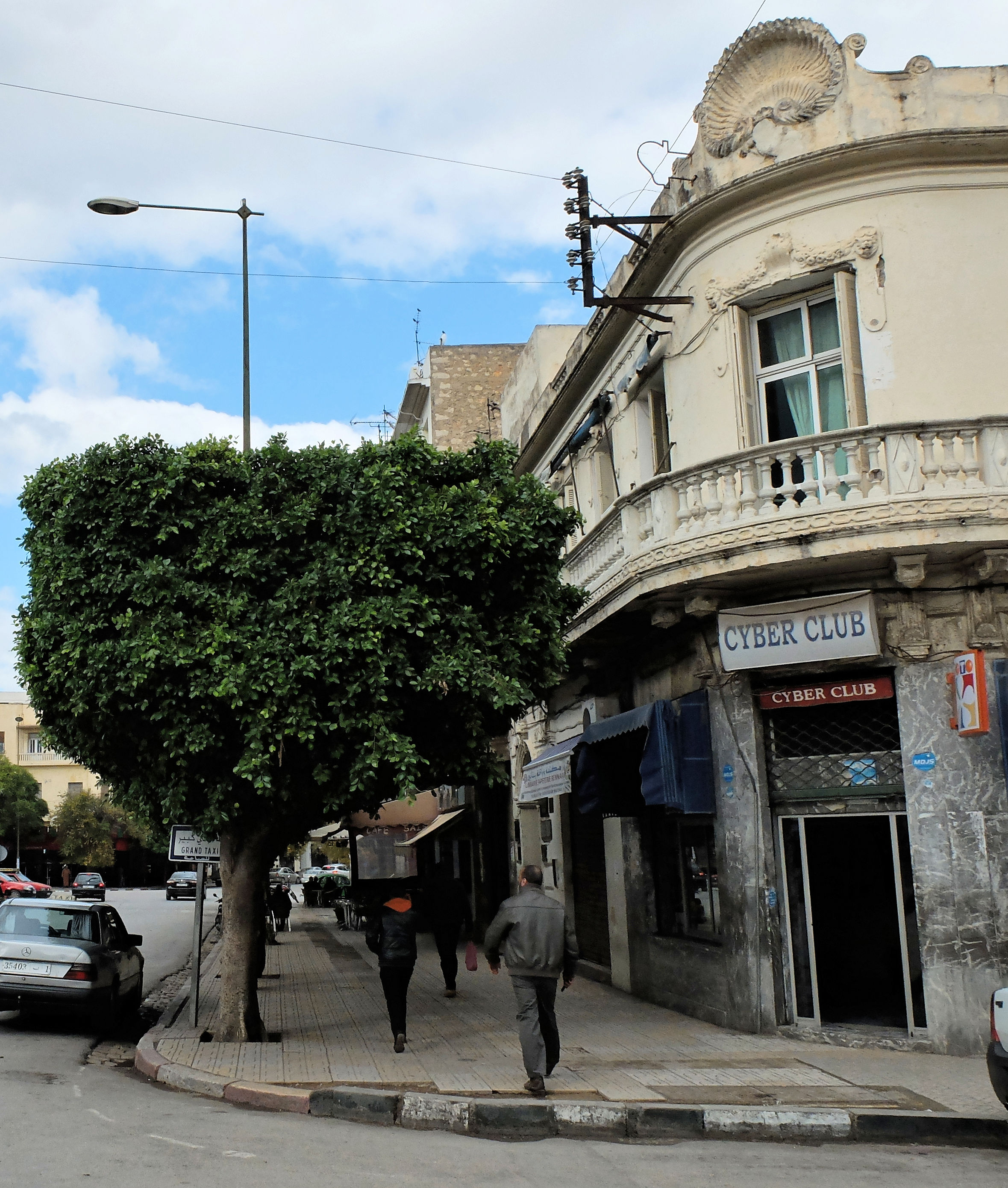
Example of French-period architecture in the Ville Nouvelle with Neoclassical influences (early 20th century)

In the 1910s and 1920s many new constructions in the Ville Nouvelle were also built with Neoclassical influences. The façades of these buildings often had eclectic ornamentation in carved stucco. Their decorative motifs were of European origin, such as floral friezes, lion heads, seashells, cherubs, and other diverse elements. The Ville Nouvelle of Fez developed more slowly than other major cities under French rule and a very large proportion its buildings from the pre-independence period (i.e. before 1956) were constructed between 1925 and 1935. After 1925 authorities became more reluctant to allow new buildings with ostentatious decoration in the downtown areas. As a result, the architecture became more somber and restrained from this period onward. Some buildings were built in the Art Deco style. Private villas, which were built further away from the new city's main arteries and thus less visible, continued to be built in more ornate styles. Some villas from this period included salons with traditional Moroccan decoration.

Today, the Medina of Fez has conserved the original functions and architecture of its urban space, leading to its inscription on the World Heritage List in 1981. The successful survival of traditional architecture can be attributed to the commitment to continue to reflect the styles of the successive waves of inhabitants, encroaching the city over its long history.

== Structure of the medina ==
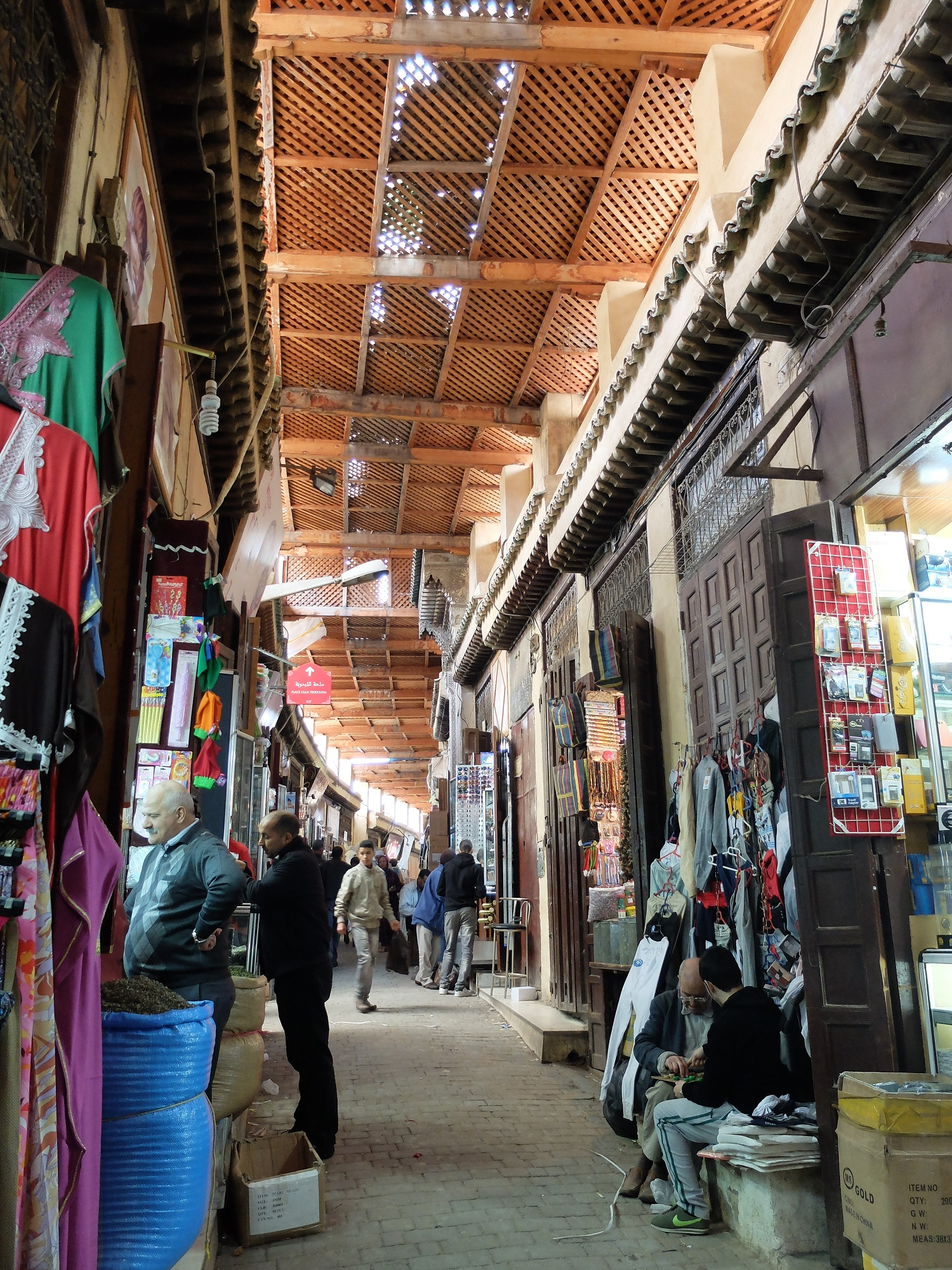
Tala'a Kebira, the longest and most important street of Fes el-Bali, runs between the western entrance of the city and the Al-Qarawiyyin area at its center. It hosts souks and shops along its length.

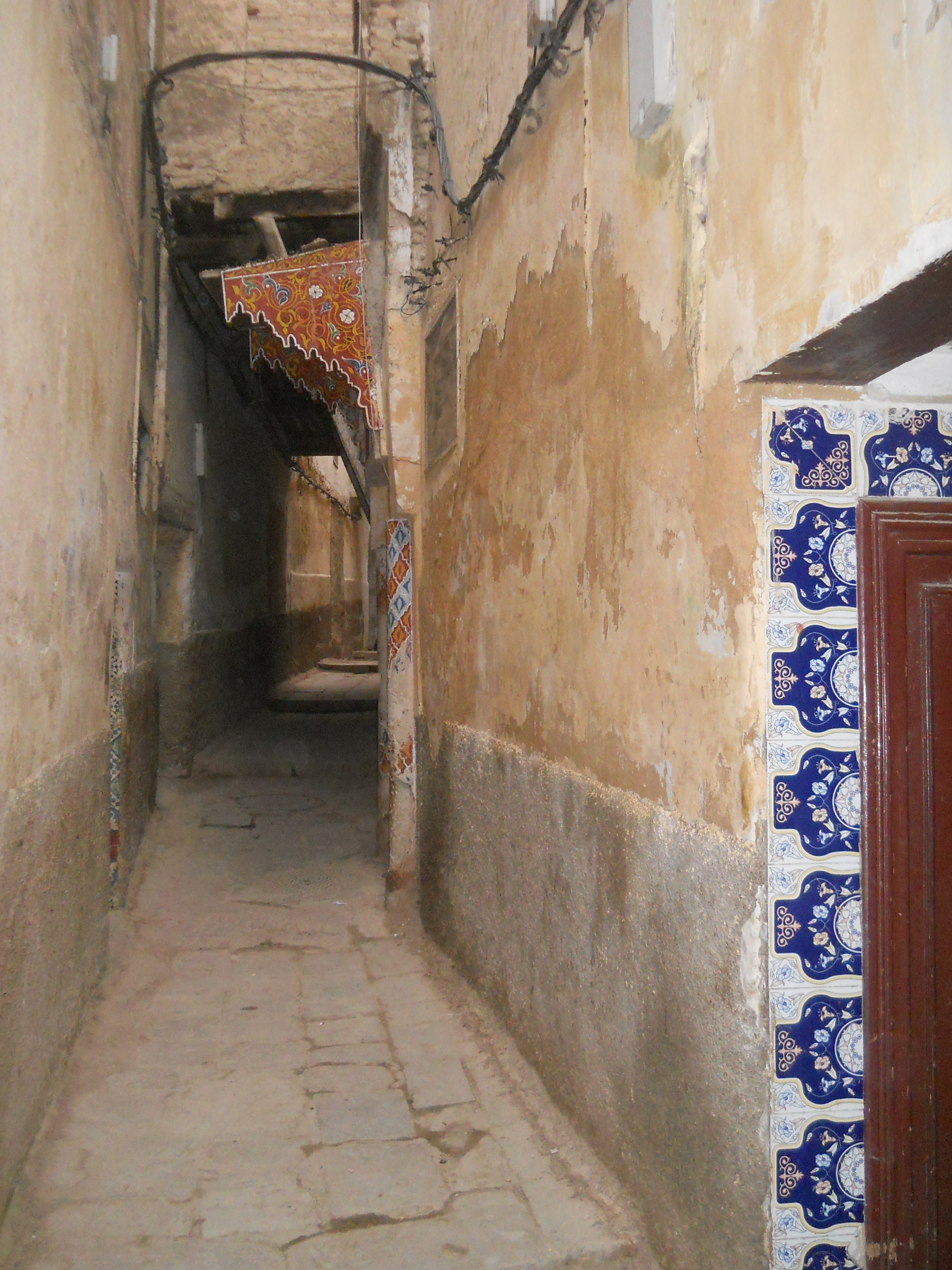
Smaller local streets, by contrast, are generally private and residential, and often lead to impasses.

The historic city of Fez consists of Fes el-Bali, the original city founded by the Idrisid dynasty on both shores of the Oued Fes (River of Fez) in the late 8th and early 9th centuries, and the smaller Fez el-Jdid, founded on higher ground to the west in the 13th century. It is distinct from Fez's now much larger Ville Nouvelle (new city) originally founded by the French. These two historic cities are linked together and are usually referred to together as the "medina" of Fez.

The Medina of Fez constitutes an area of about 800 acres and is enclosed by 25 kilometres of historic walls. As in many medieval Islamic cities, the main souk streets of Fes typically run from the city's main gates to the area of the city's main mosque (in this case the Qarawiyyin and, to a lesser extent, the Zawiya of Moulay Idris II, historically known as the Shurafa Mosque), which, in turn, lies at the center of the city's main commercial and economic zones. The souk streets themselves constitute the main commercial axes of the city and are home to most of its funduqs (inns for merchants). As a result, merchants and foreign visitors rarely had need to wander outside these areas and most of the streets branching off them lead only to local residential lanes (often called derbs), many of them leading to dead-ends. Even today, tourists are generally found only on these main commercial thoroughfares. The city's most important monuments and institutions are also located on or near its main souk streets. Accordingly, the medina has a cohesive and hierarchical urban structure that can be distinguished on two levels. At a local level, individual neighbourhoods and districts are specialized for residential, commercial, and industrial purposes. On a wider level, the city is organized in relation to major points of importance such as gates and main mosques. At this wider level, there are roughly four main centres of urban activity and organization: one around the Qarawiyin mosque, one around the Andalusiyyin Mosque, another around the Bou Inania Madrasa-Mosque, and the historically separate agglomeration of Fes el-Jdid.

== Architectural style ==
Fez contains many important examples of traditional Moroccan architecture. This architectural style developed during the Islamic period and was part of a wider cultural and artistic complex often referred to as "Moorish" architecture, which characterized the regions of Morocco, al-Andalus (Muslim Spain and Portugal), and parts of present-day Algeria and Tunisia. It blended influences from Berber culture in North Africa, pre-Islamic Spain (Roman, Byzantine, and Visigothic), and contemporary artistic currents in the Islamic Middle East to elaborate a unique style over centuries with recognizable features such as the "Moorish" arch, riad gardens, hypostyle mosques with square-shafted minarets, muqarnas sculpting, and a mix of elaborate geometric, arabesque, and calligraphic motifs in wood, stucco, and tilework (notably zellij).

Features of historic Moroccan architecture in Fez

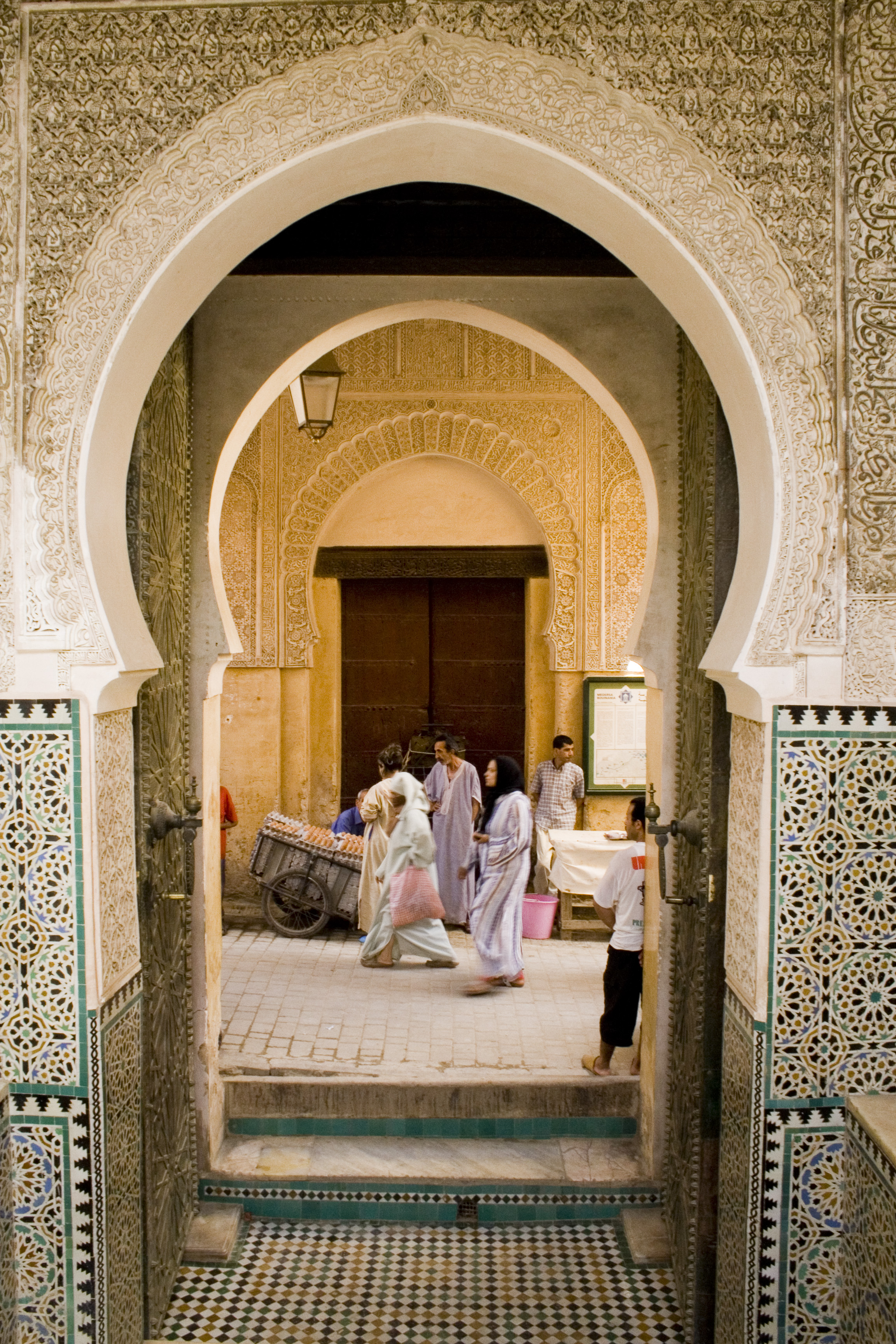
Example of horseshoe arches, at the 14th-century Bou Inania Madrasa

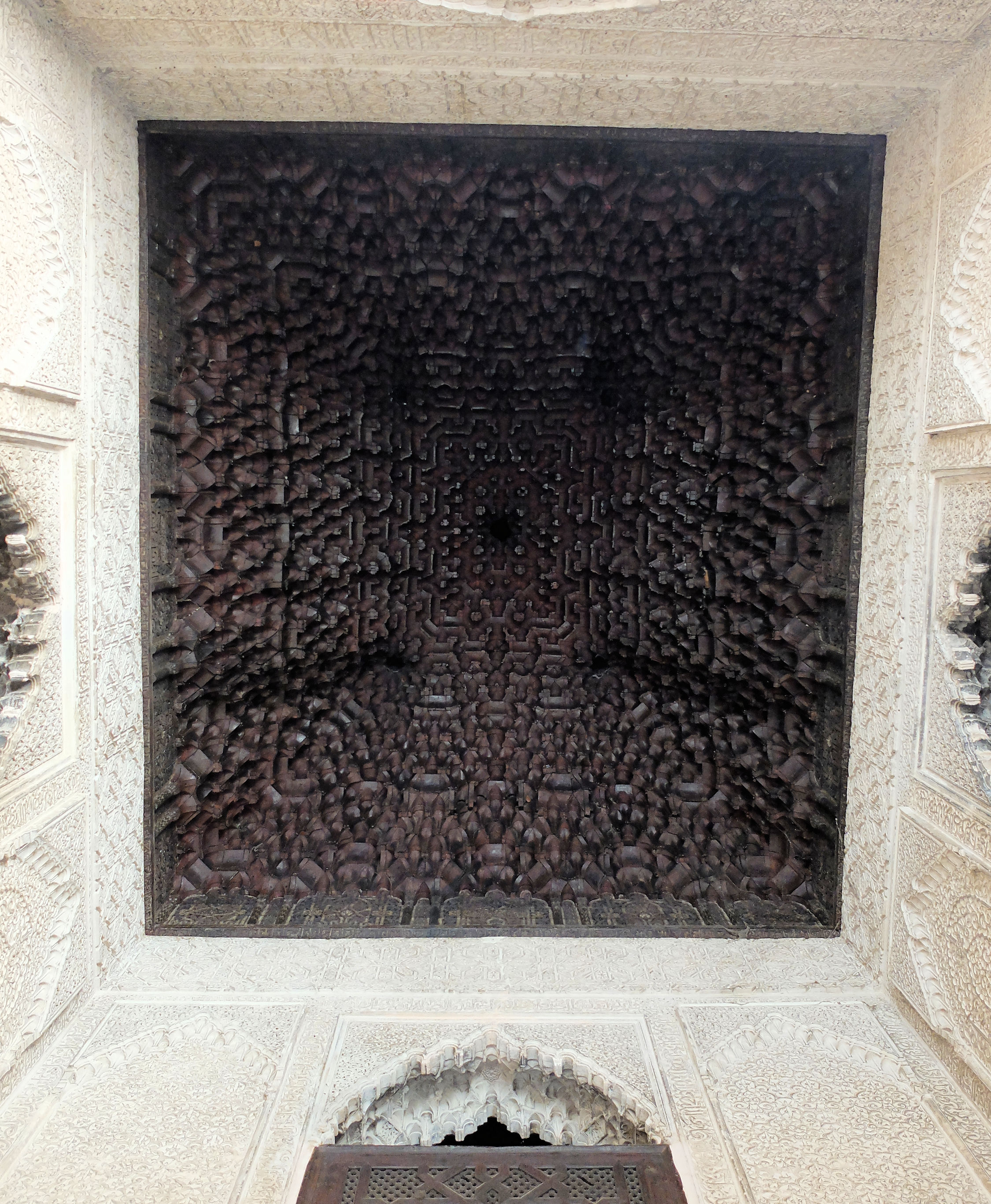
Example of a muqarnas ceiling at the Bou Inania Madrasa

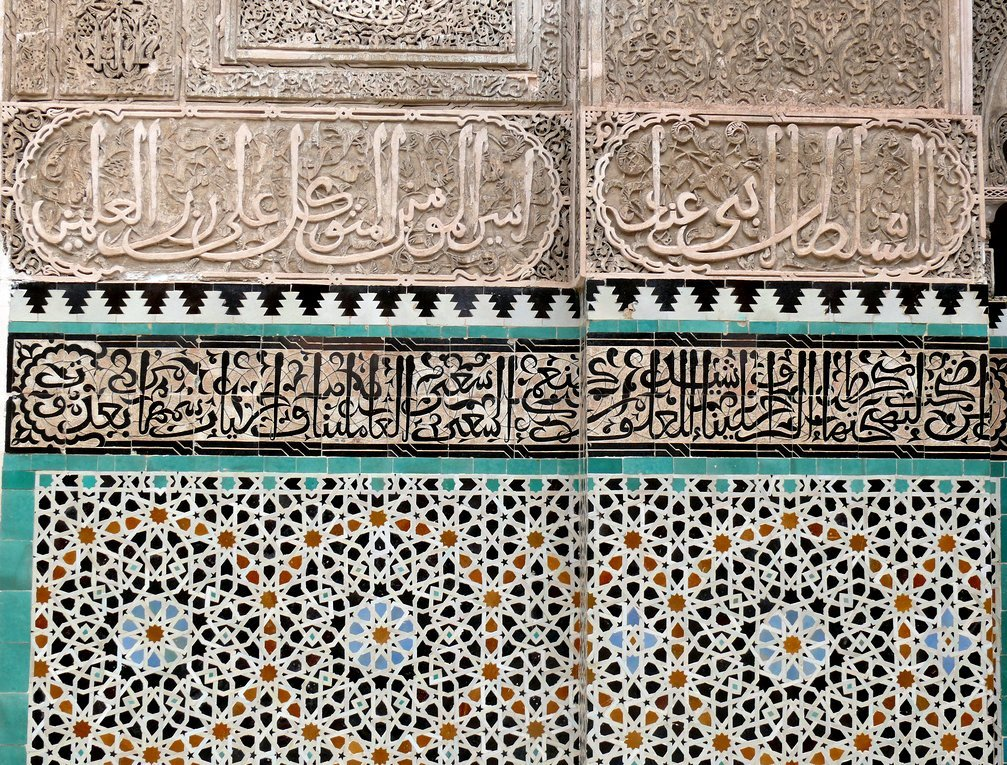
Example of geometric motifs in zellij tilework (below) and calligraphy in tile and carved stucco (above), at the Bou Inania Madrasa

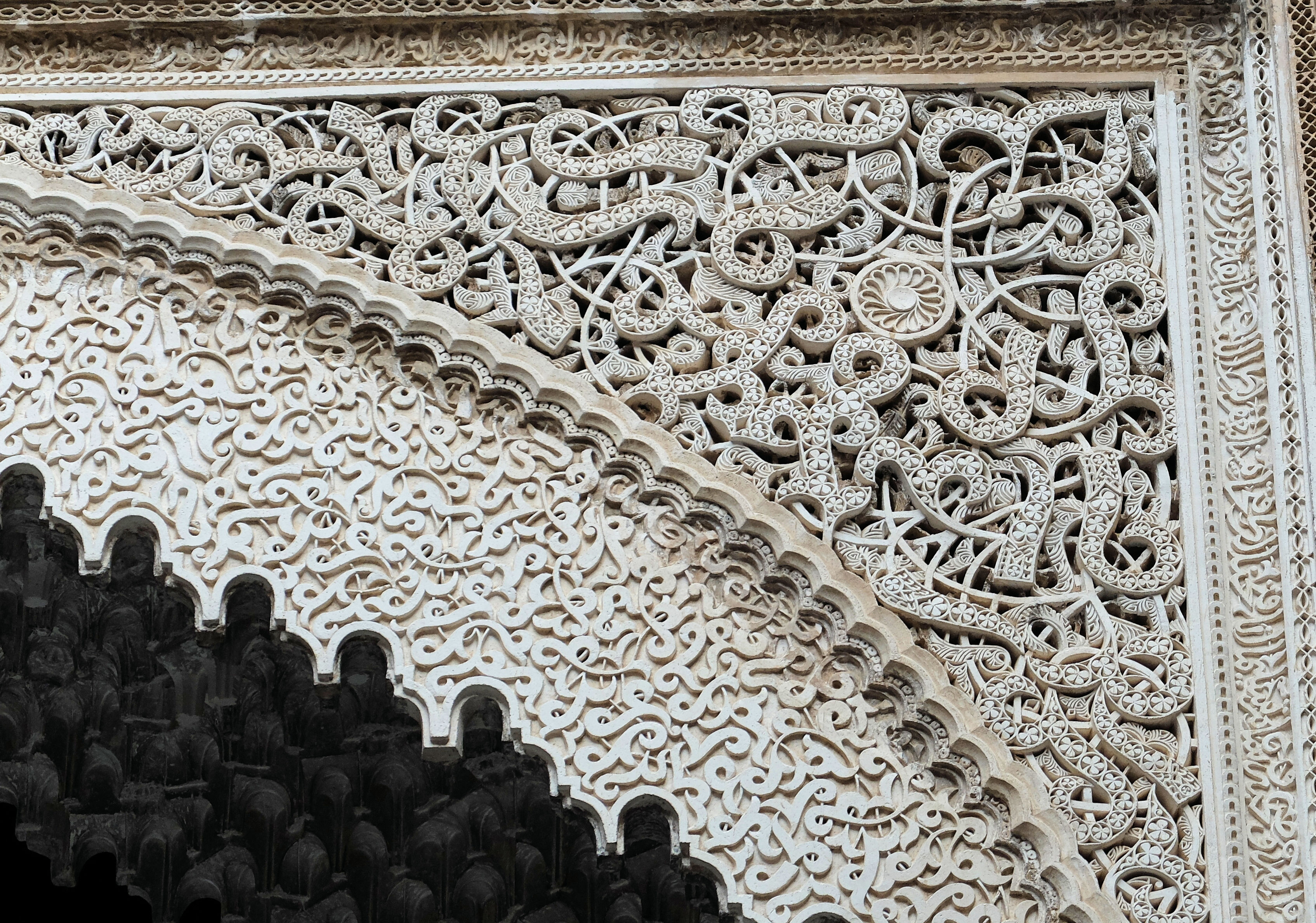
Example of arabesque motifs in carved stucco at the 14th-century Al-Attarine Madrasa

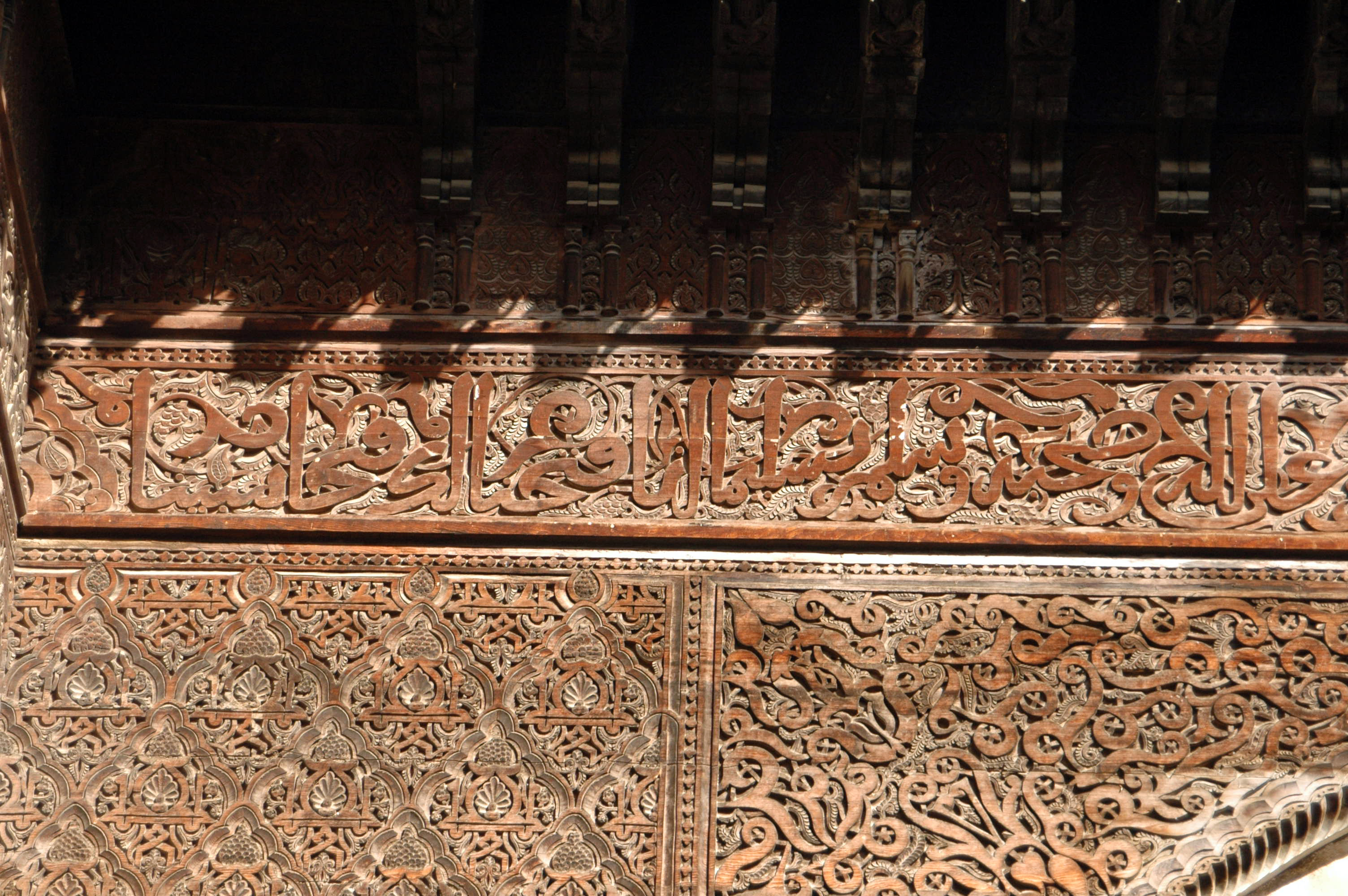
Example of wooden surfaces with ornate carved motifs at the 14th-century Sahrij Madrasa

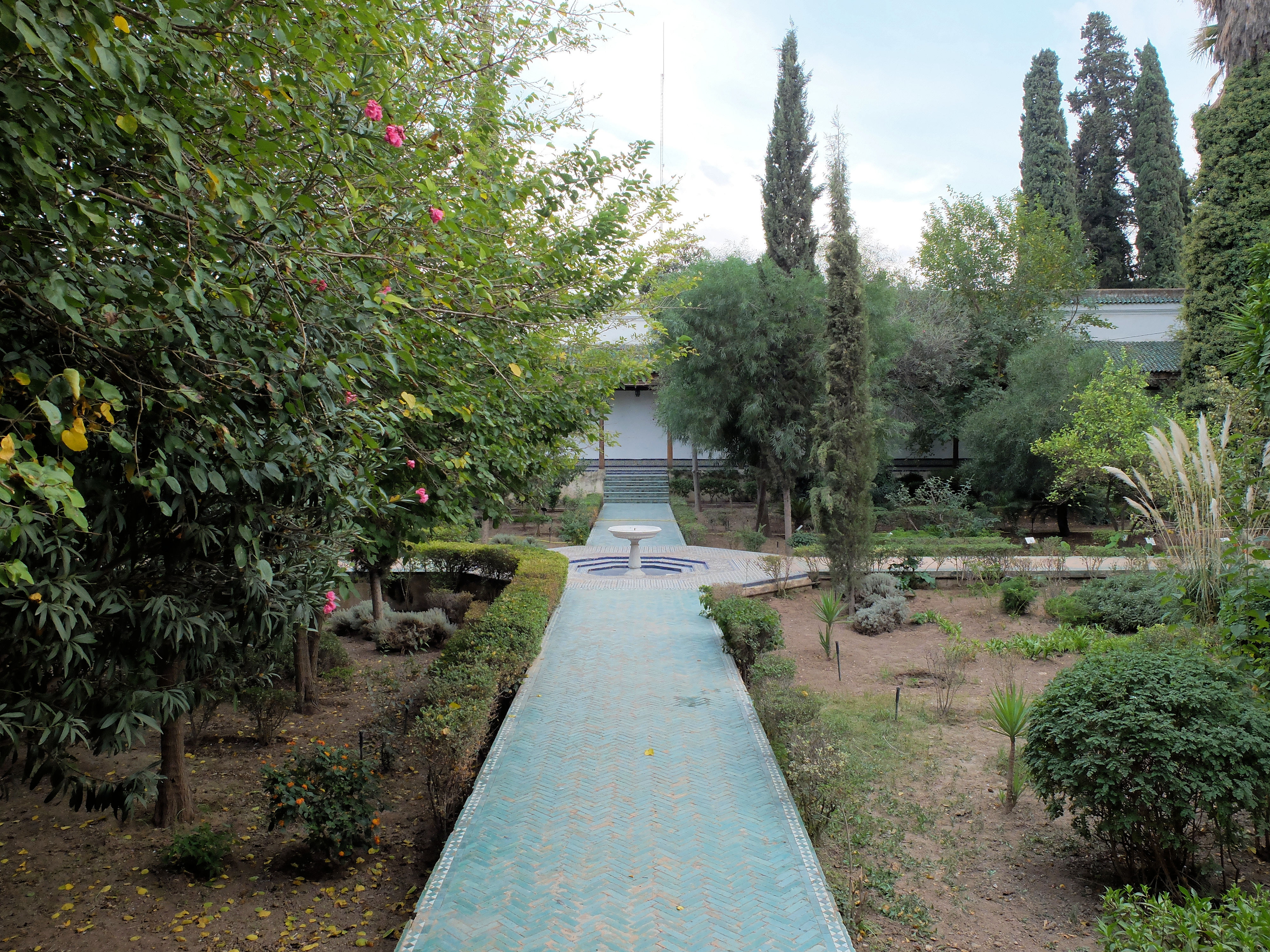
Example of a riad garden in the 19th-century Dar Batha palace

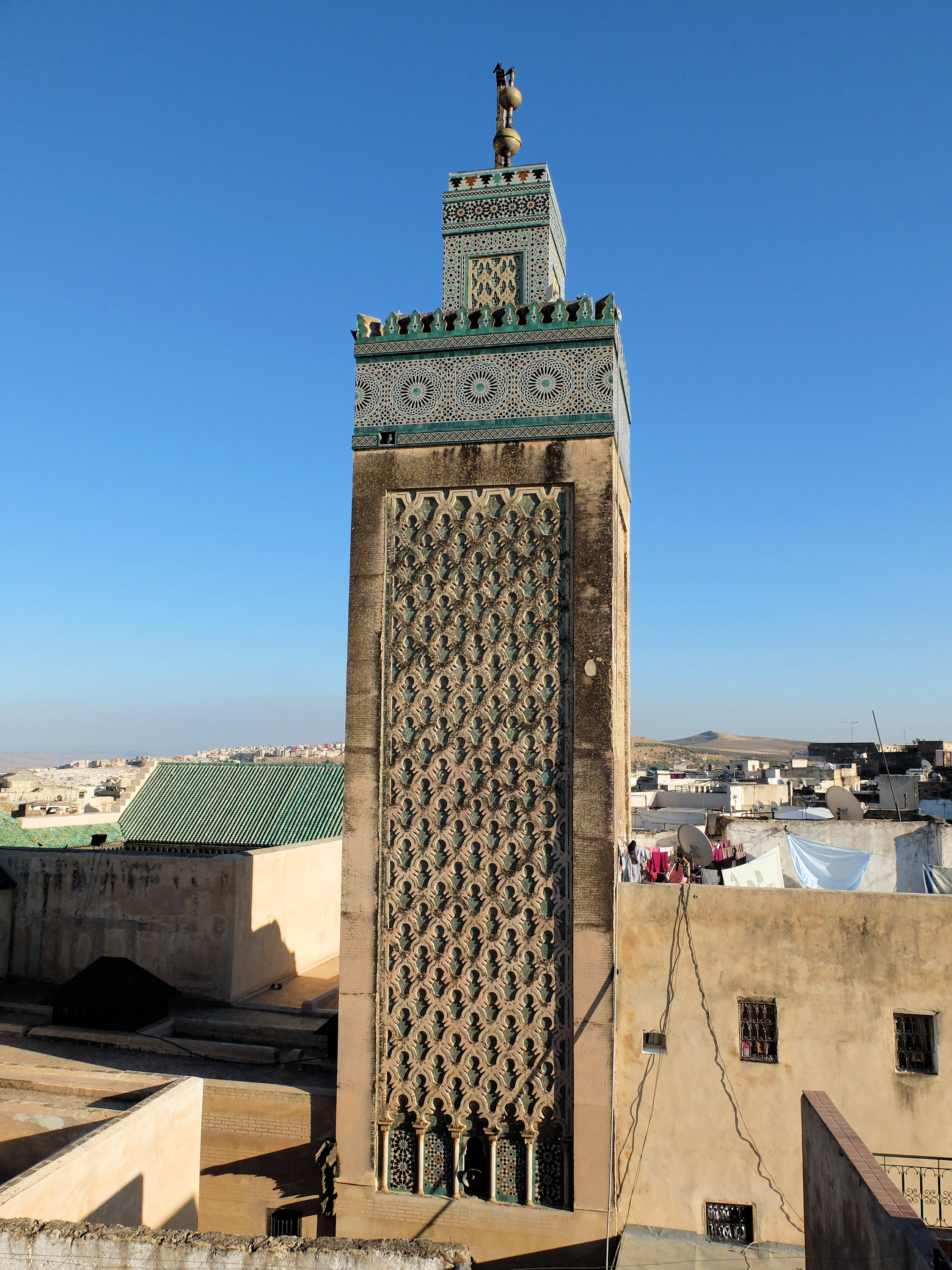
Example of a traditional minaret, at the Bou Inania Madrasa

== Types of structures ==
=== Mosques ===
==== Major historic mosques ====
Mosques are one of the most prominent architectural structures in Fez. The purpose of a mosque is multifaceted, as it serves as a place for worship and prayer, but at the same time it was also traditionally used as a centre for education and learning. As such, mosques are an indispensable component of the urban fabric of the Medina, as they bring the community together and act as a social, community centre and educational centre.

There are numerous historic mosques in the medina, some of which are part of a madrasa or zawiya. Among the oldest mosques still standing today are the highly prestigious Mosque of al-Qarawiyyin, founded in 857 (and subsequently expanded), the Mosque of the Andalusians founded in 859–860, the Bou Jeloud Mosque from the late 12th century, and possibly the Mosque of the Kasbah en-Nouar (which may have existed in the Almohad period but was likely rebuilt much later). The very oldest mosques of the city, dating back to its first years, were the Mosque of the Sharifs (or Shurafa Mosque) and the Mosque of the Sheikhs (or al-Anouar Mosque); however, they no longer exist in their original form. The Mosque of the Sharifs was the burial site of Idris II and evolved into the Zawiya of Moulay Idris II that exists today, while the al-Anouar Mosque has left only minor remnants. The Qarawiyyin Mosque was first established as a place of worship but teaching lessons were also conducted within the mosque and it evolved to become a place for cultivating knowledge of the Islamic sciences and other sciences. Thus, it simultaneously developed into a major educational institution with scholarly status, and since 1963 it has been a state university of Morocco.

A number of mosques date from the important Marinid era, when Fez was the capital of Morocco and Fes el-Jdid was created. These include the Great Mosque of Fez el-Jdid from 1276, the Abu al-Hasan Mosque from 1341, the Sharabliyyin Mosque from 1342, the al-Hamra Mosque from around the same period (exact date unconfirmed), the Lalla az-Zhar Mosque from 1357, and the Lalla Ghriba Mosque from 1408. Except for the Lalla Ghriba Mosque, all of them have richly decorated minarets, in addition to other ornamental features. The Bab Guissa Mosque also originally dates from the reign of Marinid sultan Abu al-Hasan (1331-1351) but has been more heavily modified in later centuries. Other major mosques from the more recent Alawi period include most notably the Moulay Abdallah Mosque, built in the early to mid-18th century and adjoined by a necropolis containing the tomb of Sultan Moulay Abdallah and later Alawi dynasty members. The Diwan Mosque, the R'cif Mosque, and the current El-Oued Mosque were all built in the reign of Moulay Slimane (1793-1822). The Zawiya of Moulay Idris II (previously mentioned) and the Zawiya of Sidi Ahmed al-Tijani include mosque areas as well, as do several other prominent zawiyas in the city.

Major historic mosques of Fez

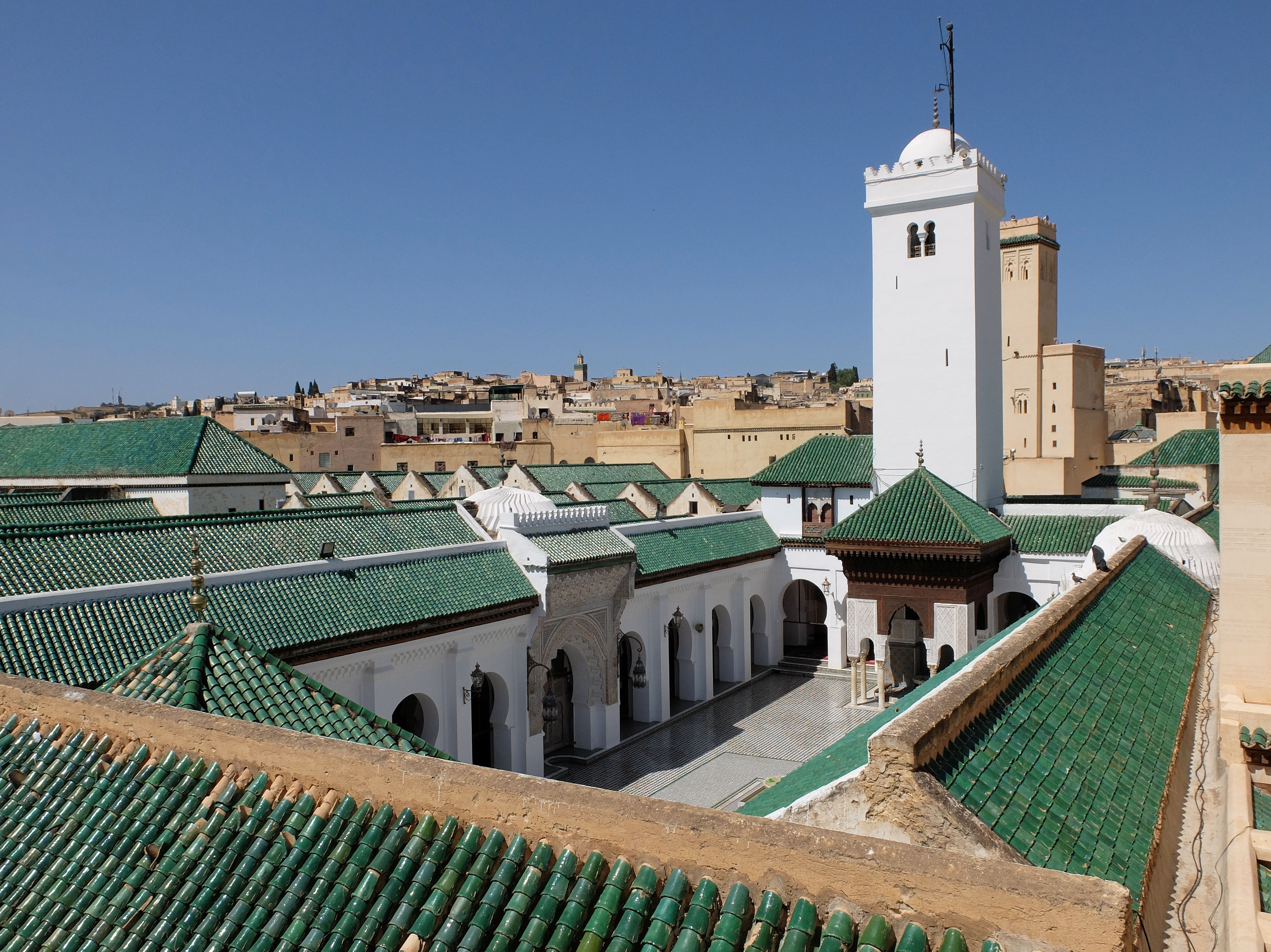
Al-Qarawiyyin Mosque (founded in 9th century and expanded multiple times)

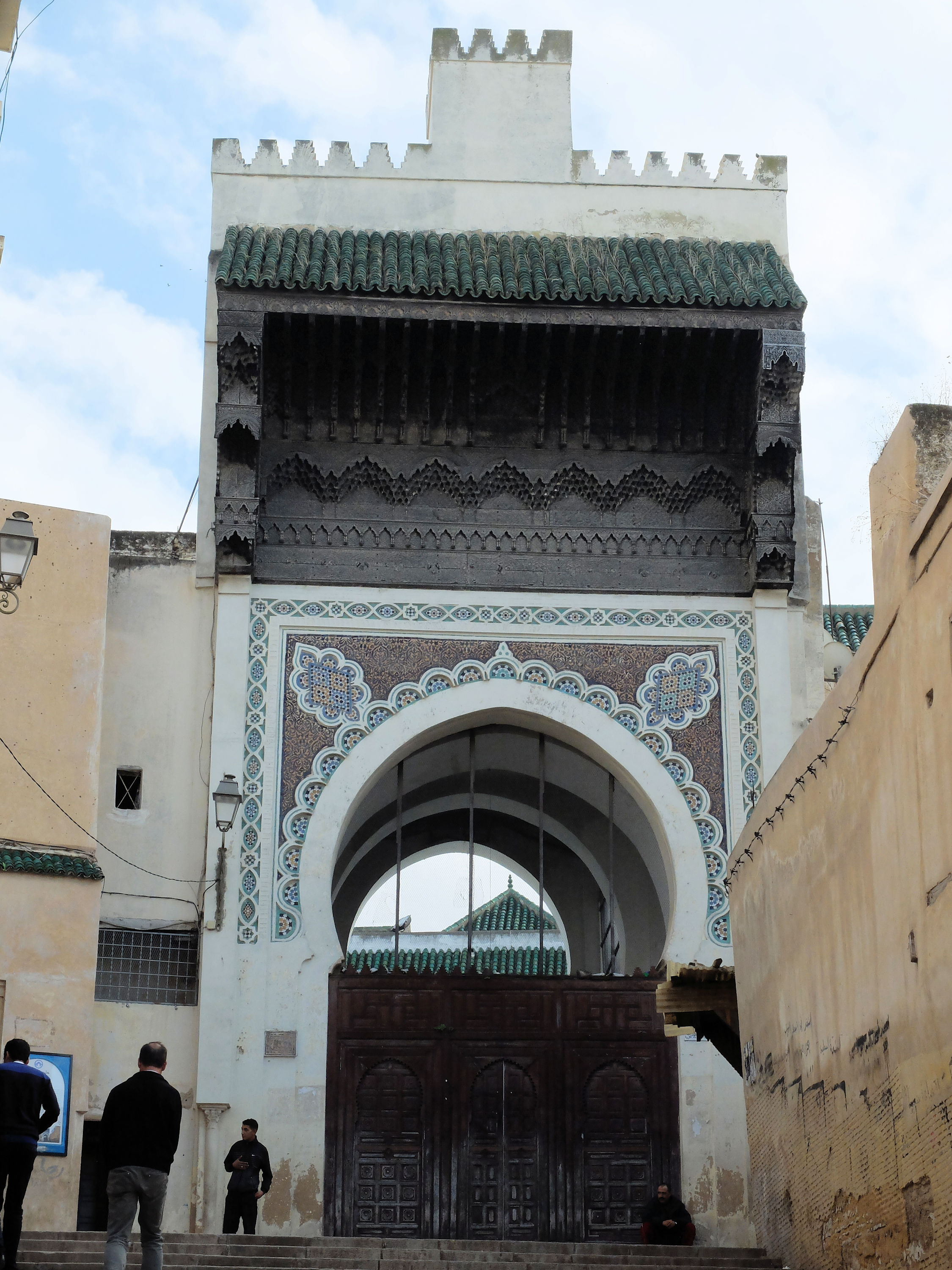
Entrance of the Al-Andalusiyyin Mosque (founded in 9th century and subsequently expanded)

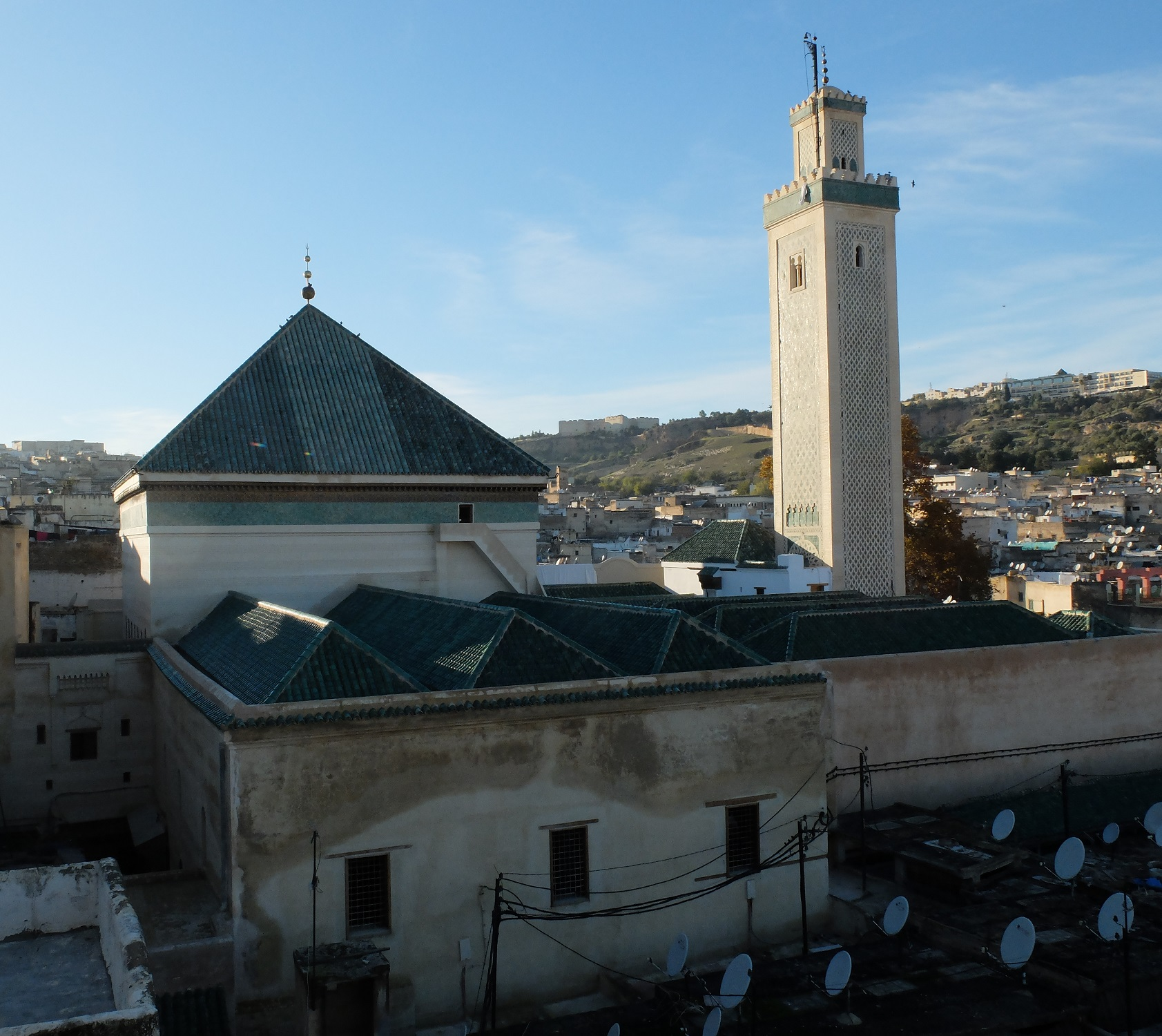
The Zawiya of Moulay Idris II, originally the site of the Shurafa Mosque founded by Idris II (who is still buried here)

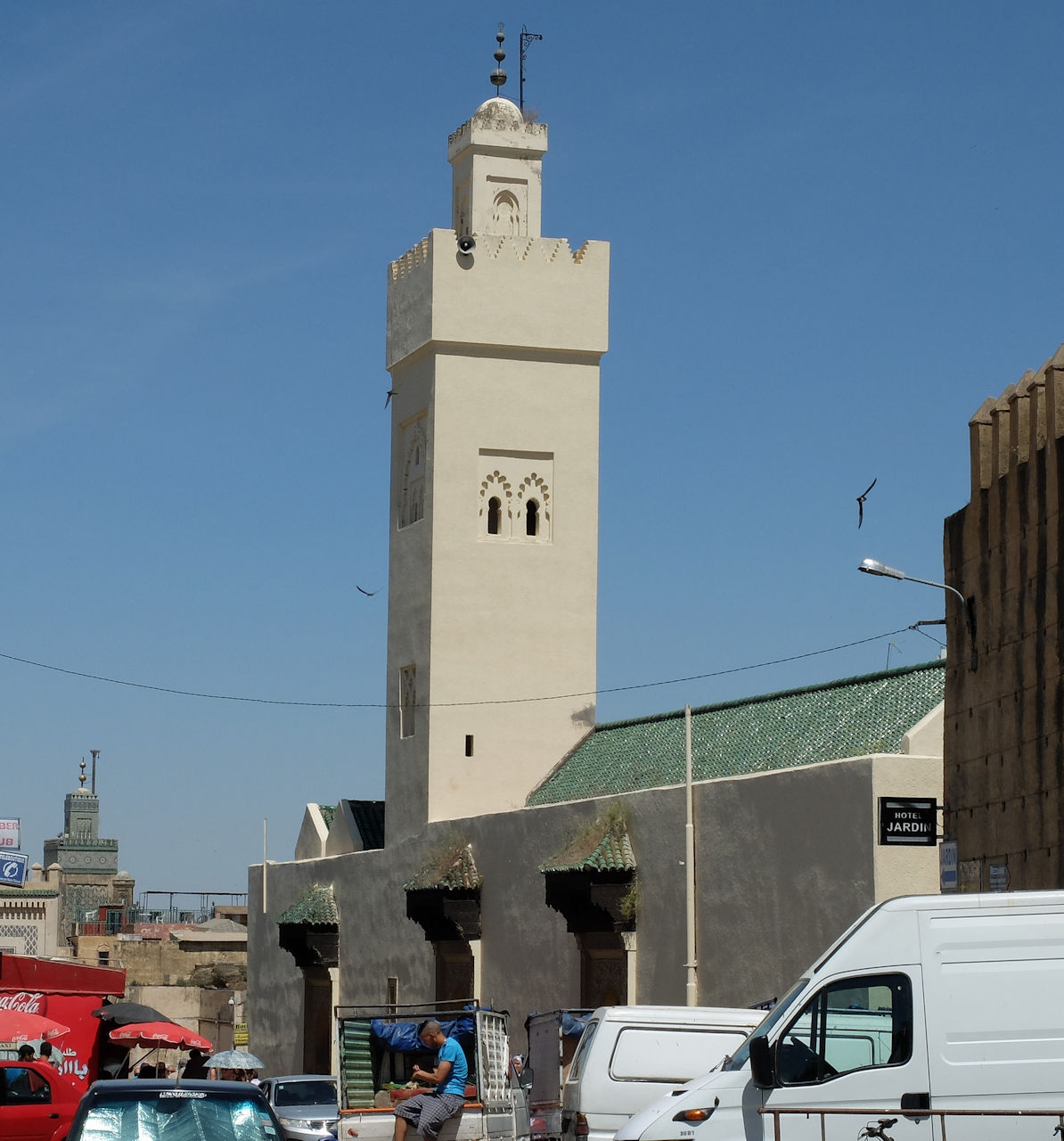
The Bou Jeloud Mosque (founded in the late 12th century)

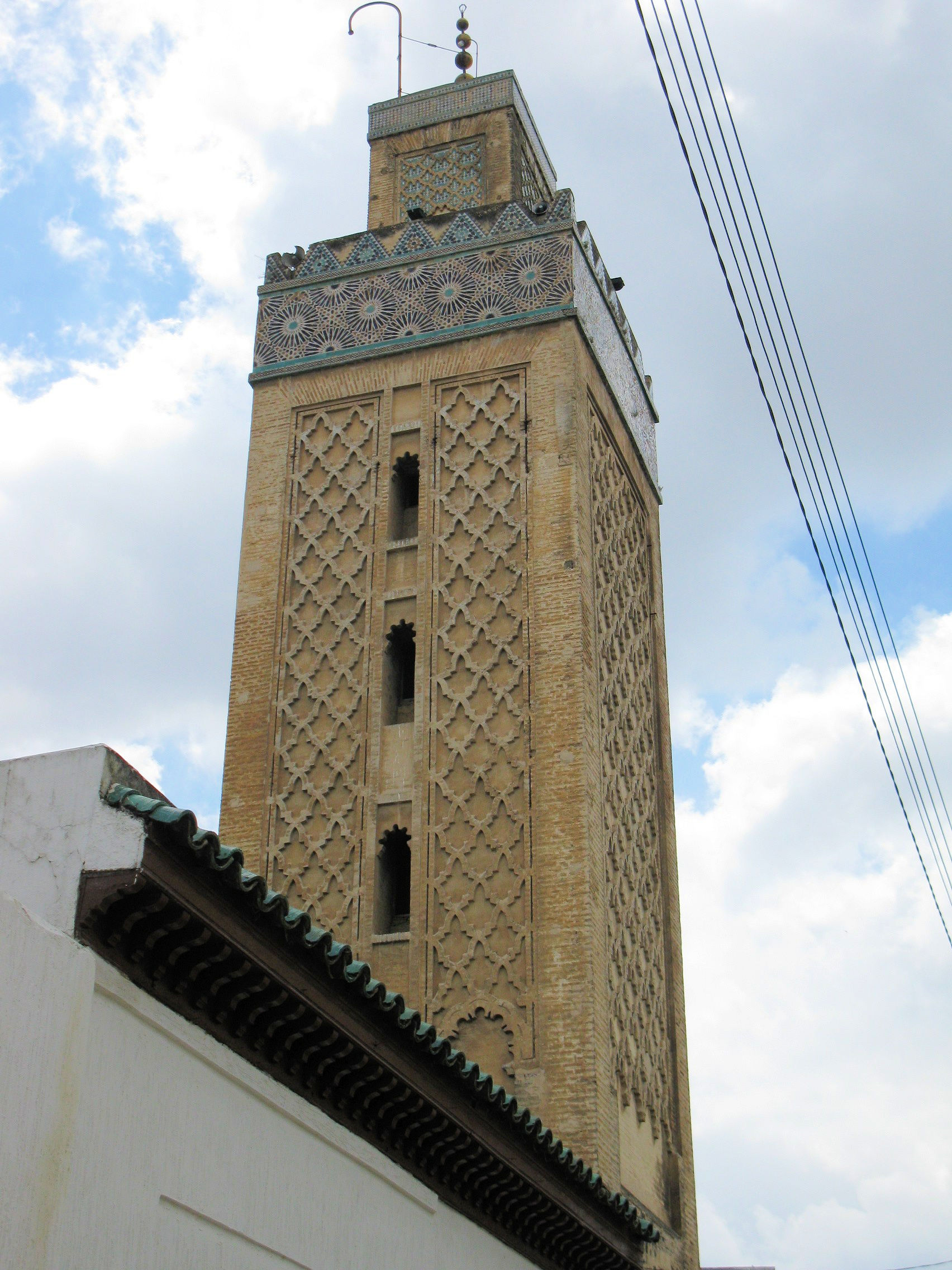
Grand Mosque of Fes el-Jdid (founded in late 13th century)

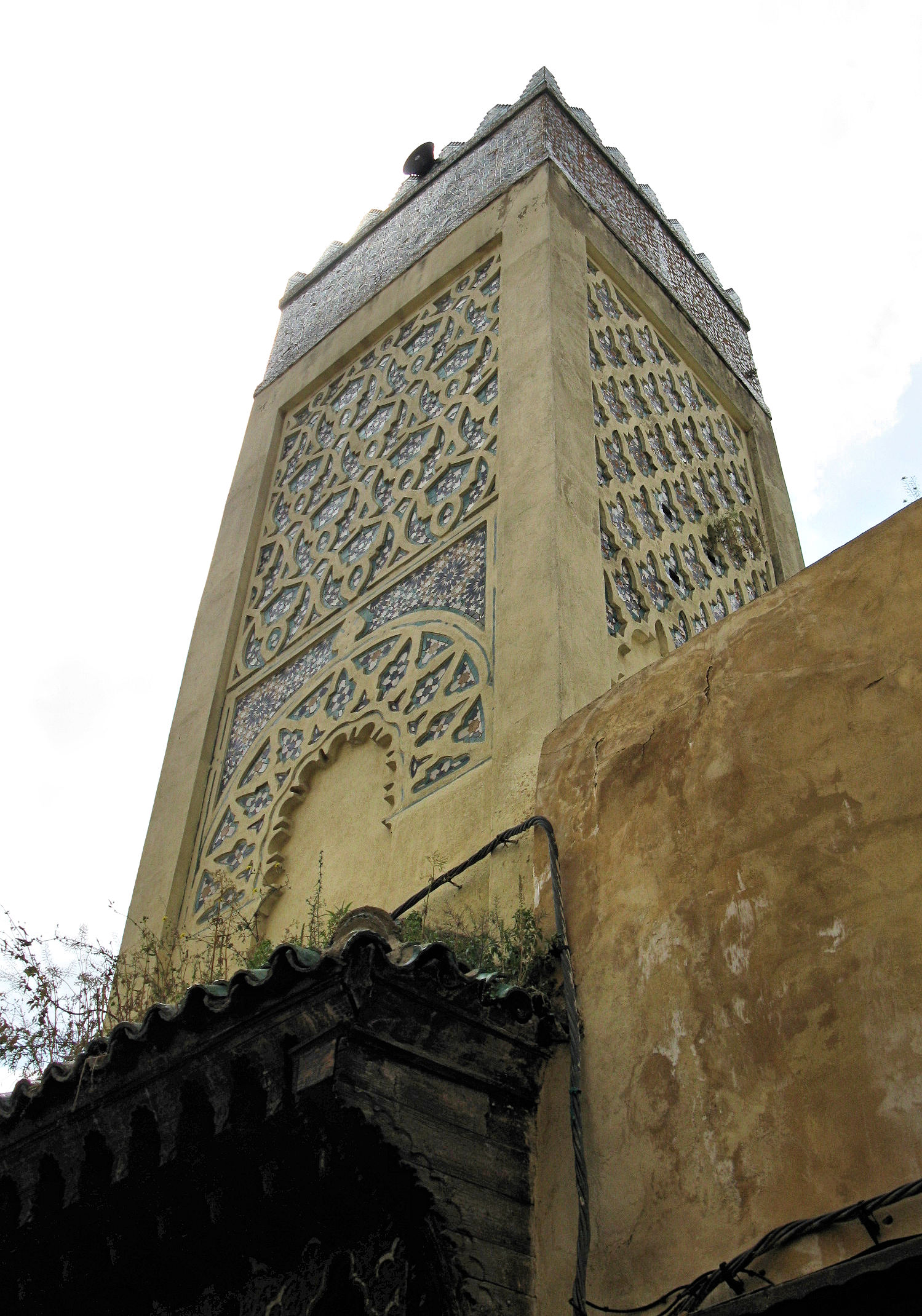
Mosque of Abu al-Hasan (founded in the 14th century)

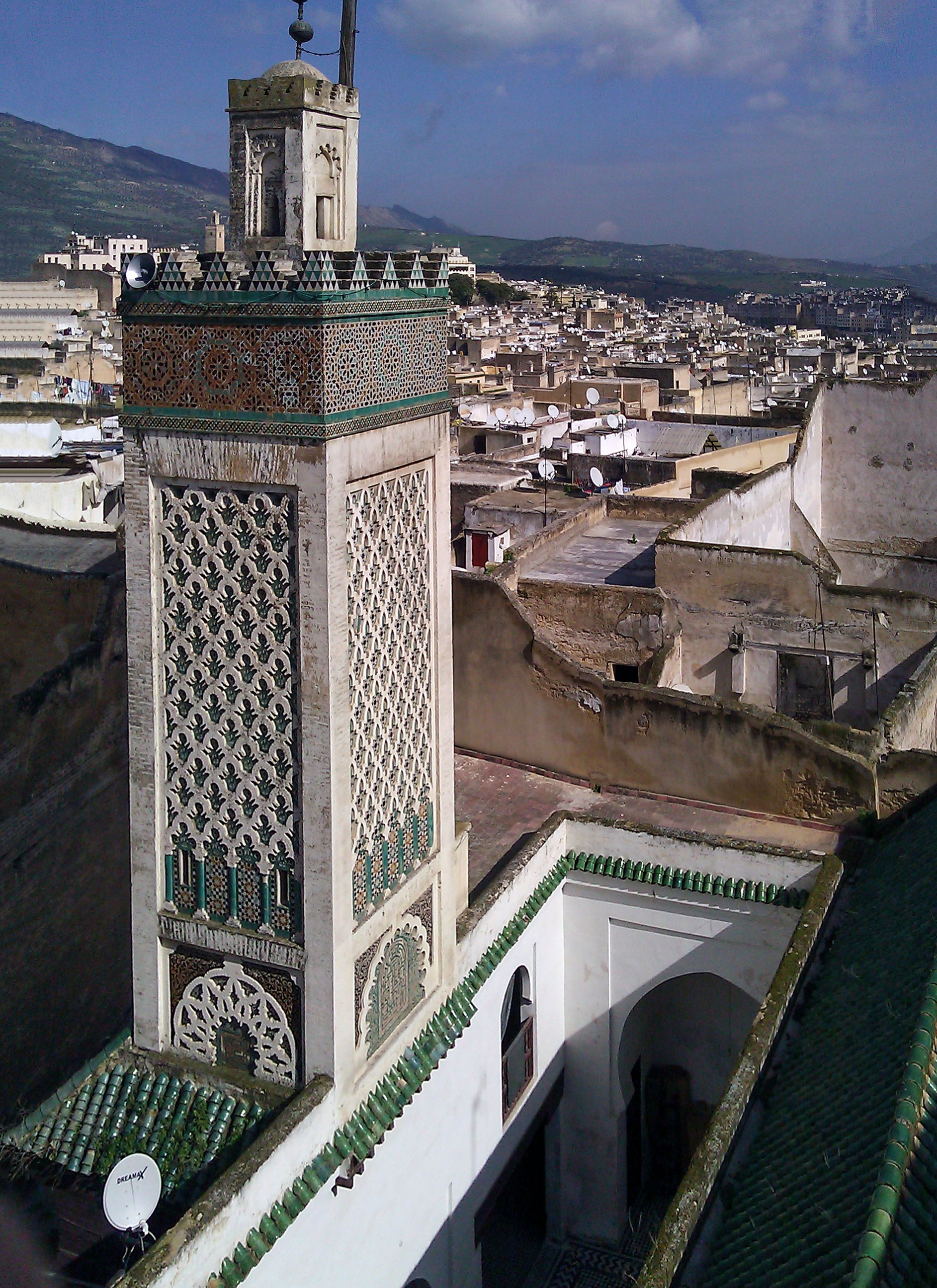
Sharabliyyin Mosque (founded in the 14th century)

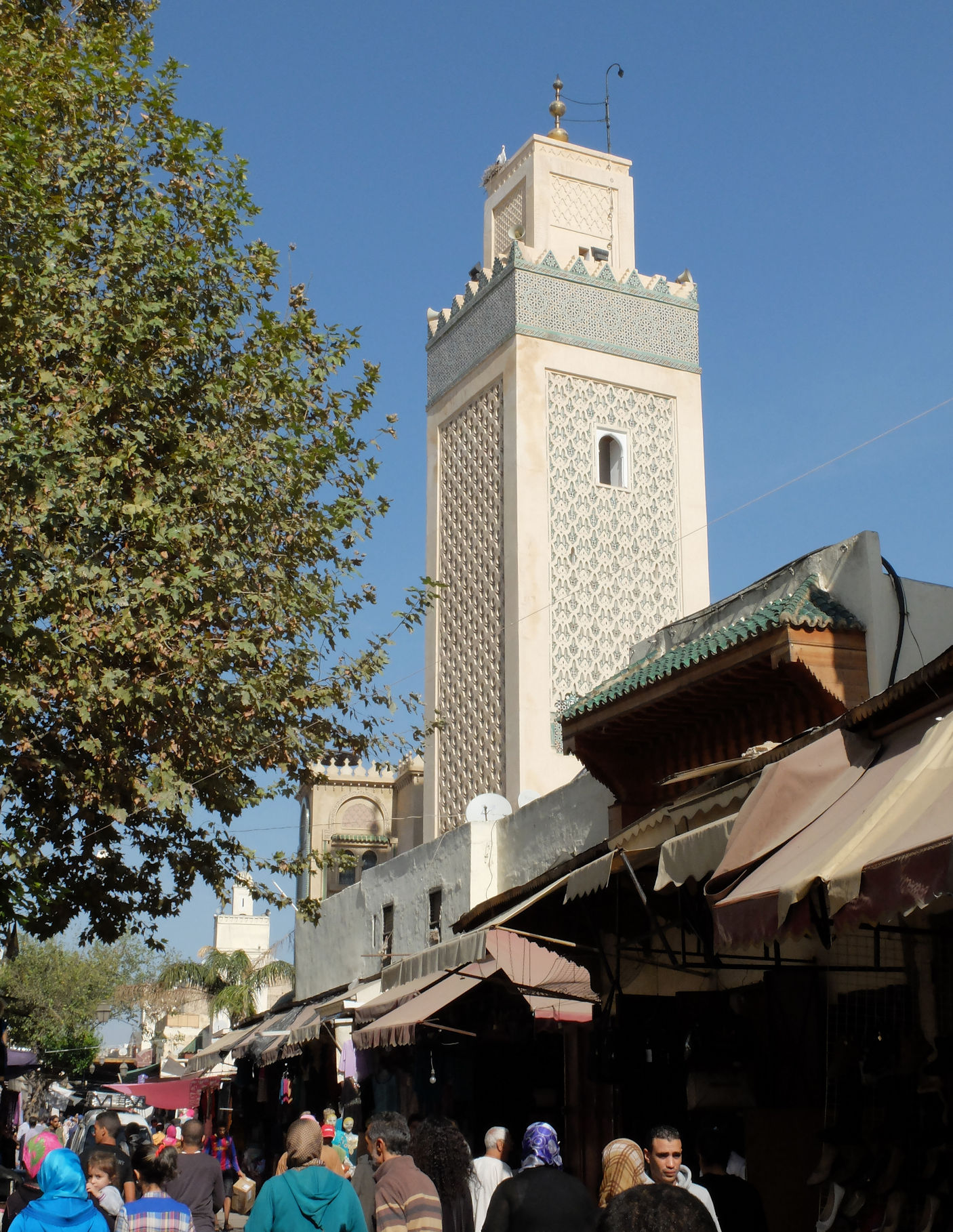
Al-Hamra Mosque (probably founded in the 14th century)

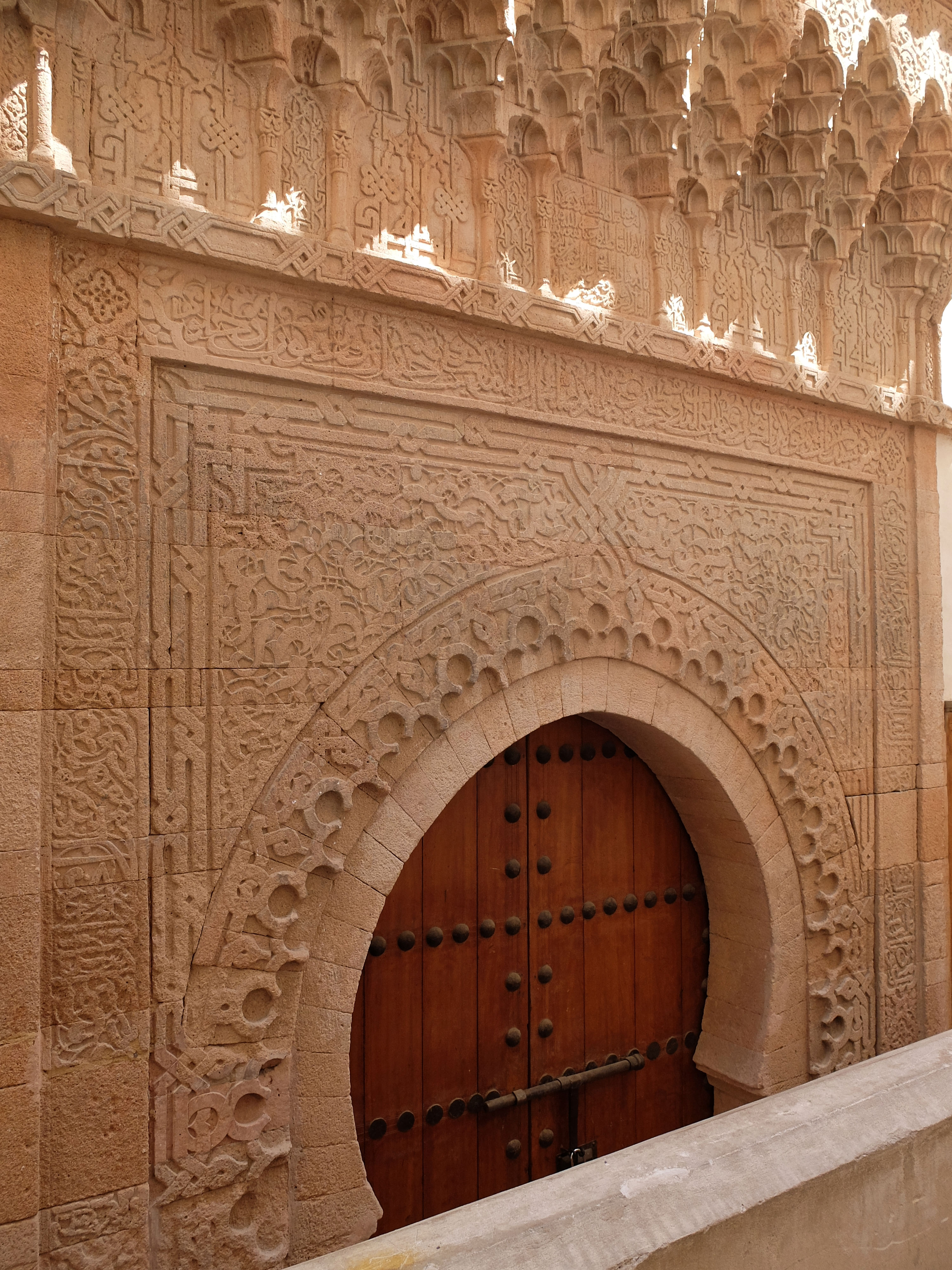
Stone portal of the Lalla ez-Zhar Mosque (14th century)

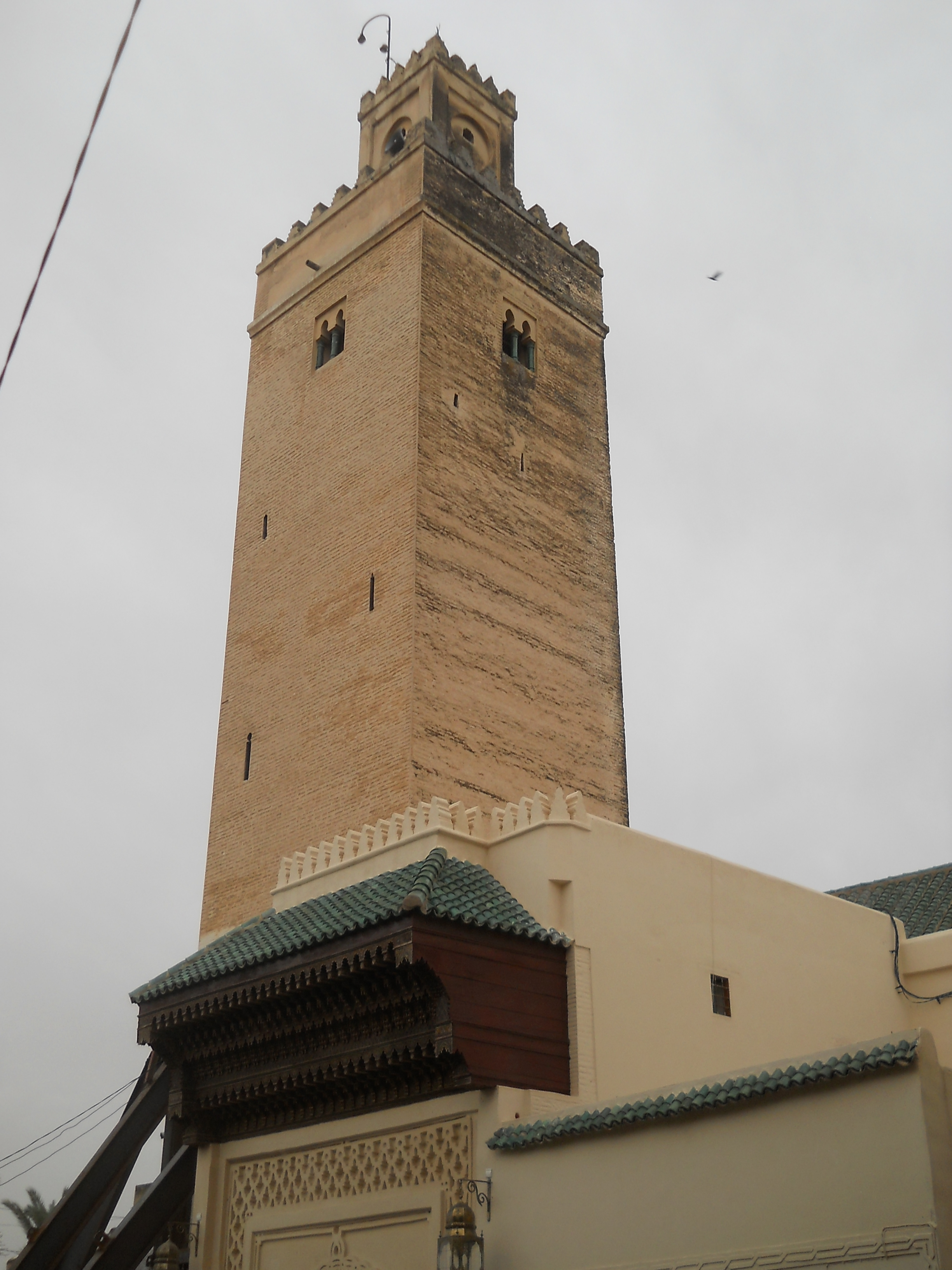
Bab Guissa Mosque (founded in the 14th century)

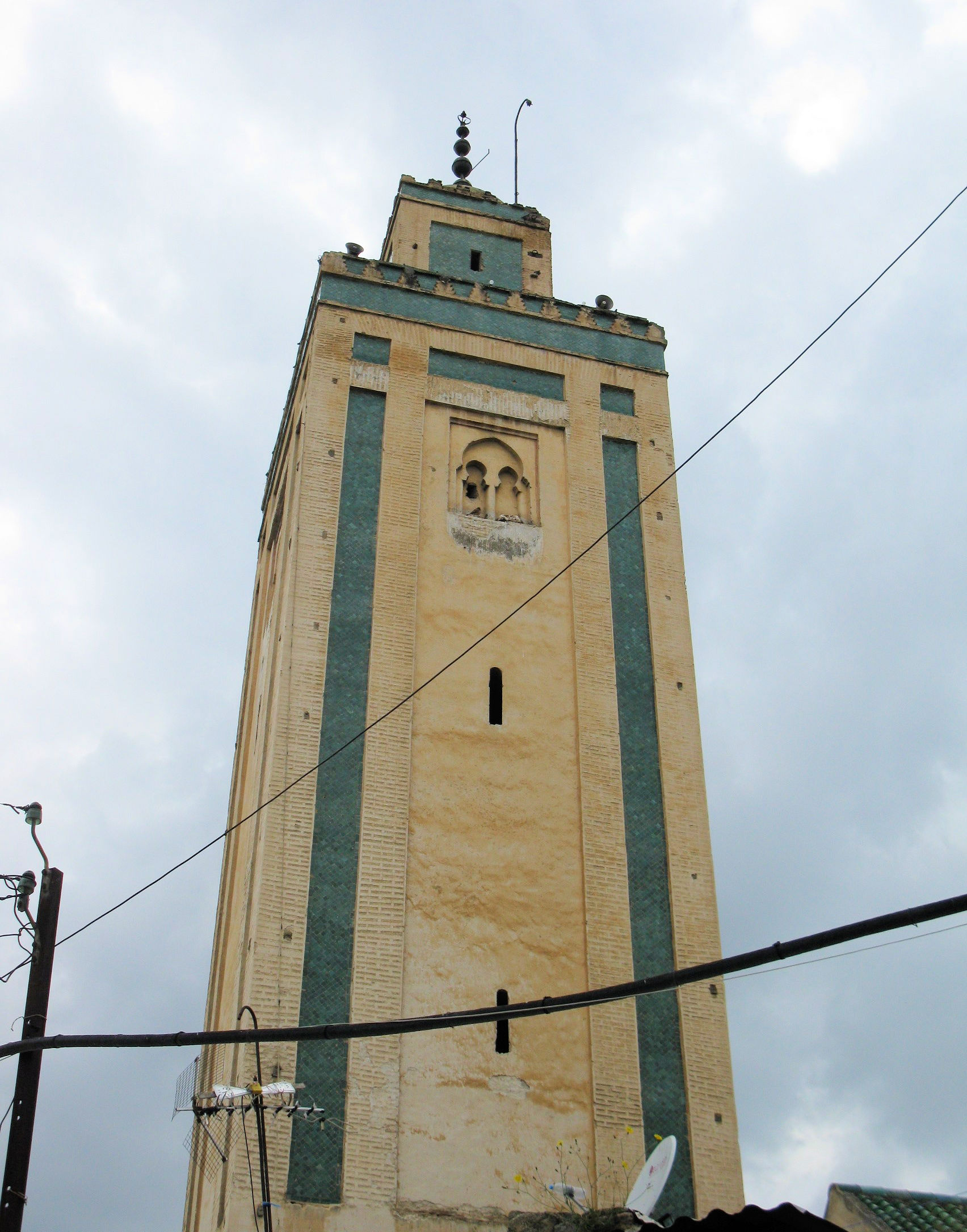
Moulay Abdallah Mosque (18th century)

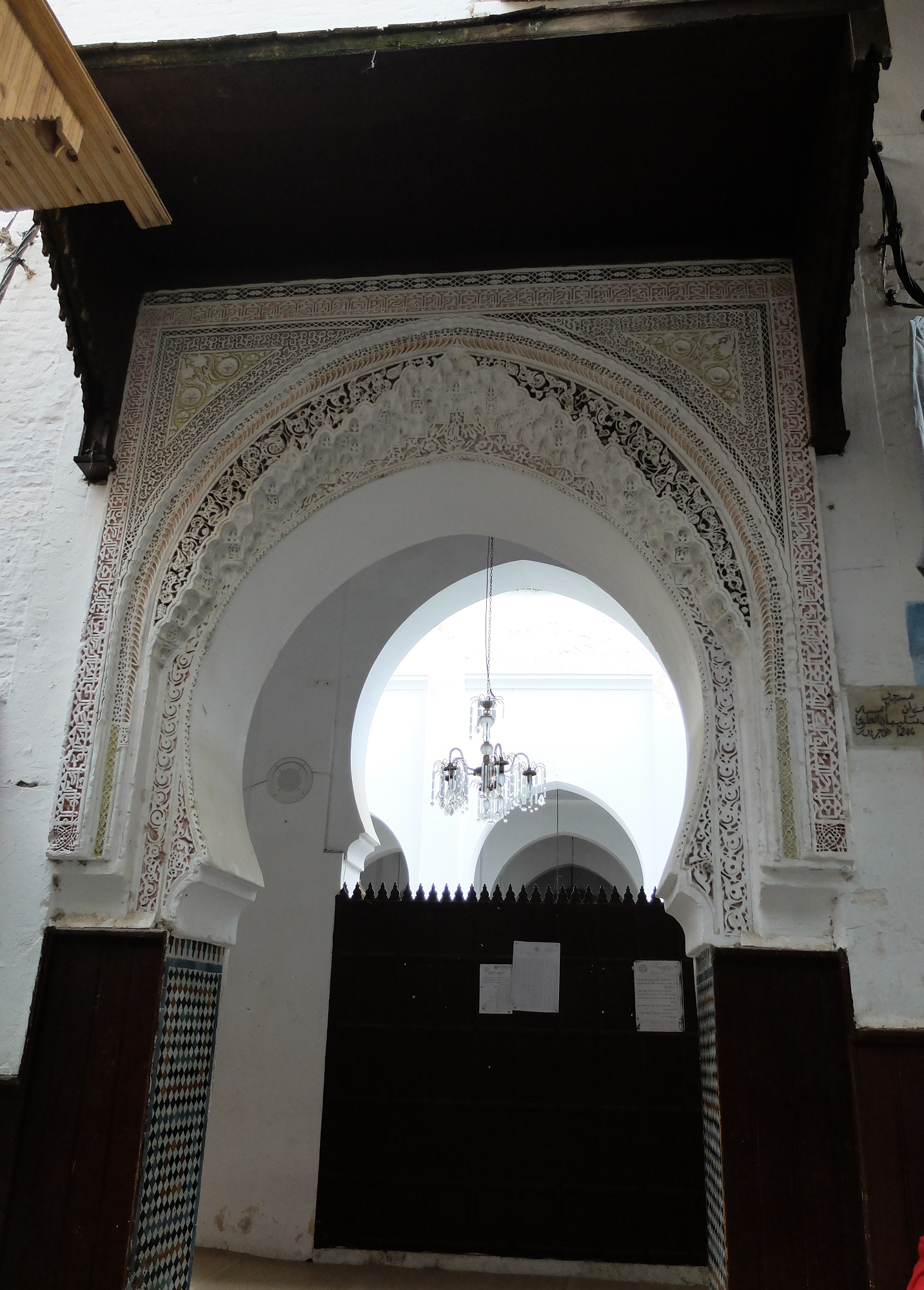
Diwan Mosque (founded between 1792 and 1822)

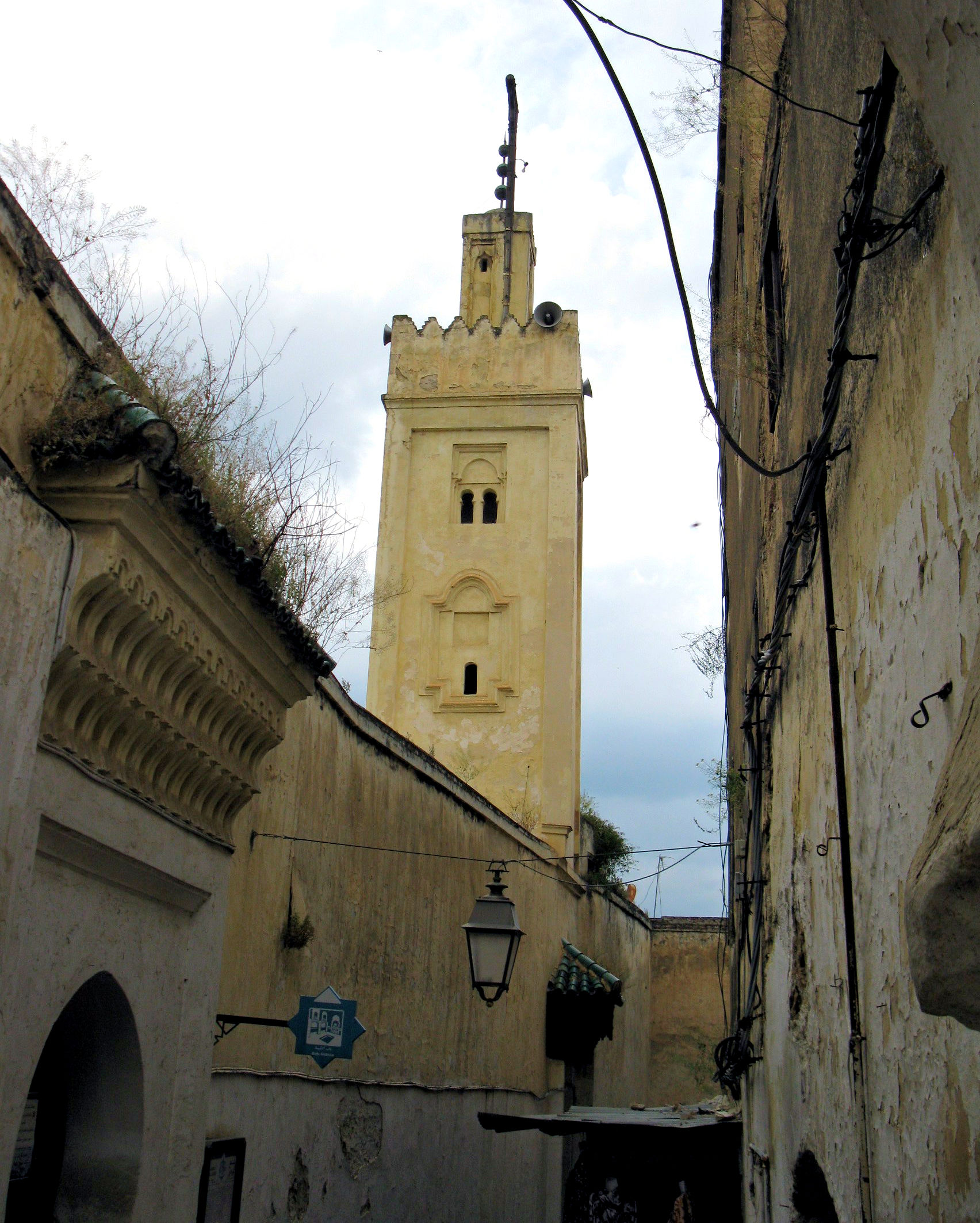
El-Oued Mosque (founded between 1792 and 1822, replacing an earlier madrasa)

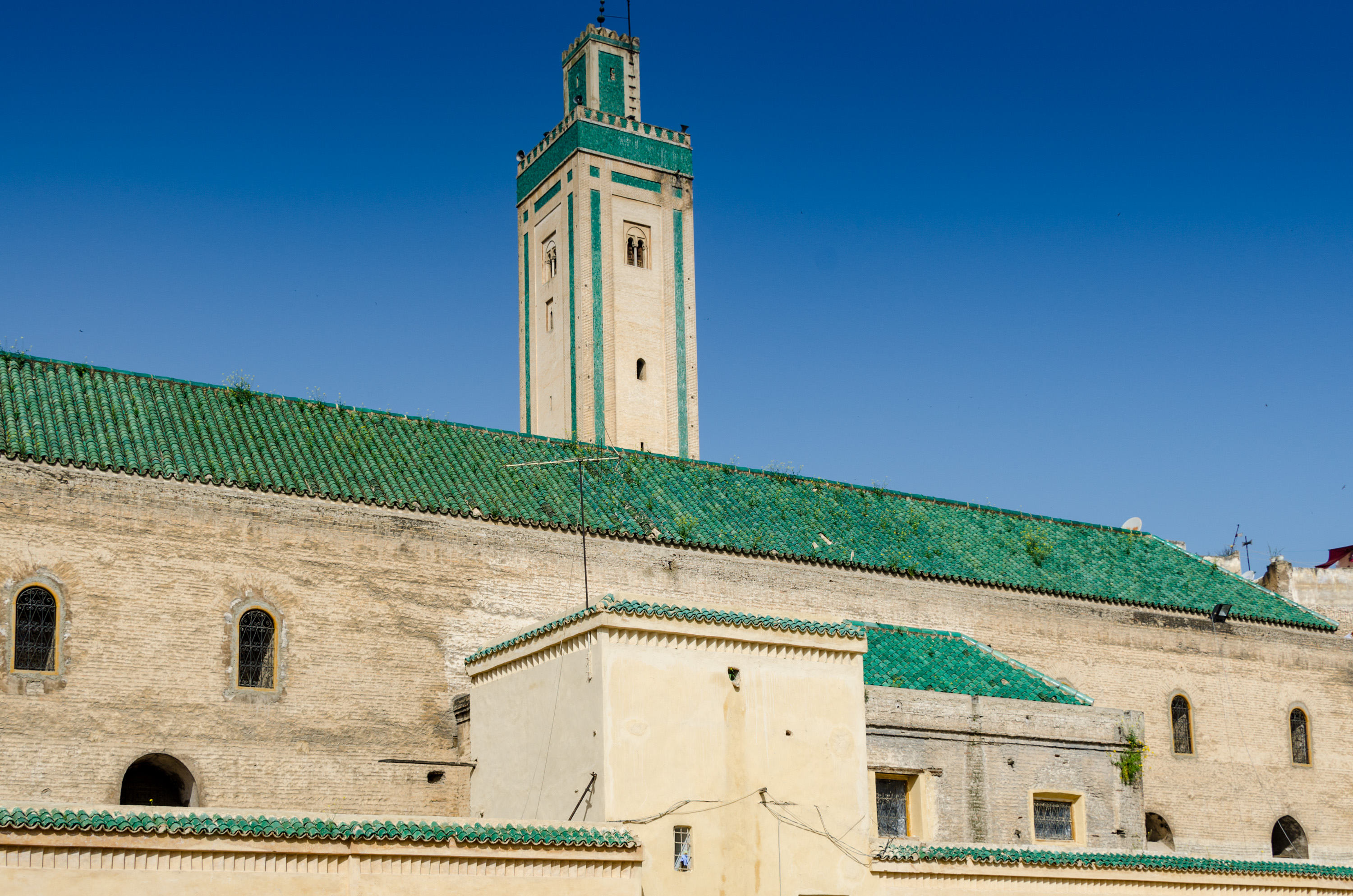
R'cif Mosque (founded between 1792 and 1822)

==== Other mosques ====
The old city includes a multitude of other historic local mosques which are less well-documented. A 1932 study by Russian-French architect Boris Maslow described and illustrated some of them. Some have interesting architectural details that demonstrate variations from other classic Fassi mosques. The following are some examples:

- The Mosque of Ain al-Kheil (also called the Al-Azhar Mosque) has an octagonal minaret as well as two prayer halls located on two levels; both features not found in typical mosques of the city. It is reputed to have been frequented by the famous Sufi scholar Ibn Arabi and is therefore believed to have existed since the late 12th century (during the Almohad period).
- The Al-Beida Mosque has a street fountain and a notable minaret that is prominently visible along the main street of Fes el-Jdid, just north of the al-Hamra Mosque. Boris Maslow saw clear signs that it went through two different periods of construction, but no dates are indicated by scholars other than the assumption that it was built some time after the nearby al-Hamra Mosque (14th century).
- The Mzellja Mosque, located in the Douh neighbourhood (western Fes el-Bali), originally dates from the Marinid period and features an elegant decorative panel of square Kufic script above its street entrance.
- The Derb esh-Sheikh (or Derb ech-Cheikh) Mosque, located just northeast of the Hammam al-Mokhfiya in the el-Gzira neighbourhood, has a minaret with a broad darj-wa-ktaf motif carved in brick on its southern and eastern facades (the sides facing the street) while its northern and western facades have been left blank. The secondary lantern-tower on top of the minaret's main shaft was rebuilt in modern times.
- The Ras 'Ain Azliten Mosque, located in the 'Ain Azliten neighbourhood in northern Fes el-Bali, likely dates from the late 14th century during the Marinid period. Its minaret shares with the Derb esh-Sheikh minaret the characteristic of selective decoration: only its northern façade, facing the street, is finely decorated, while the other facades are blank.
- The minaret of the Zellja Mosque, visible next to the modern Boulevard Ben Mohammed El Alaoui (the main road leading to Place R'cif), is unusually simple and has no secondary lantern-tower at all, being instead capped by a small pyramidal roof of green tiles.

The Ville Nouvelle (New City) also includes many modern mosques from the 20th century or later. Some prominent landmark mosques here include the Imam Malik Mosque, the largest in the city and located near the train station, and the Tunis Mosque (Masjid Tunis), dating from the French colonial period and located near the downtown area.

Other mosques of Fez

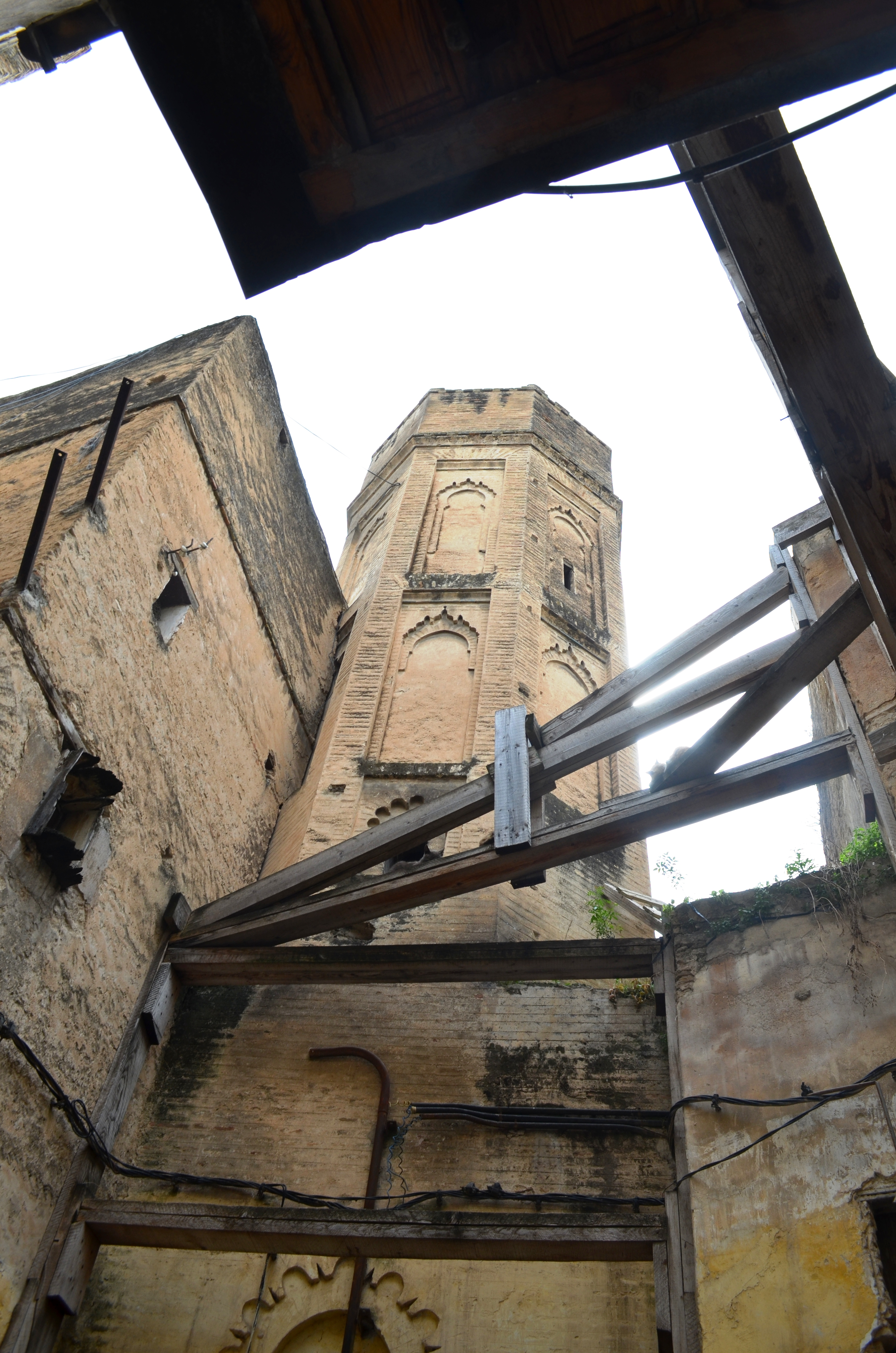
The octagonal minaret of the Ain al-Kheil Mosque, seen from the street below

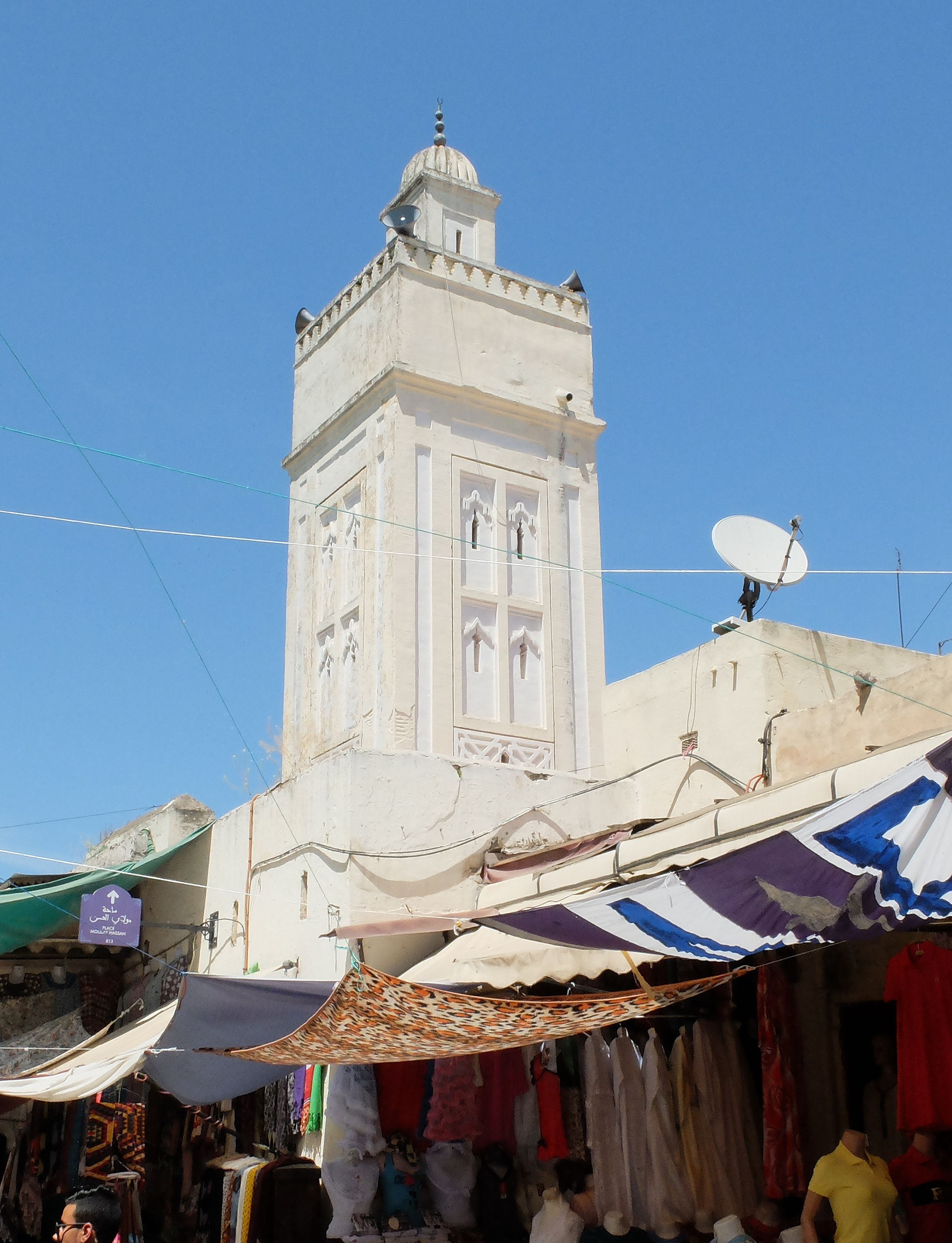
The Al-Beida Mosque in Fes el-Jdid

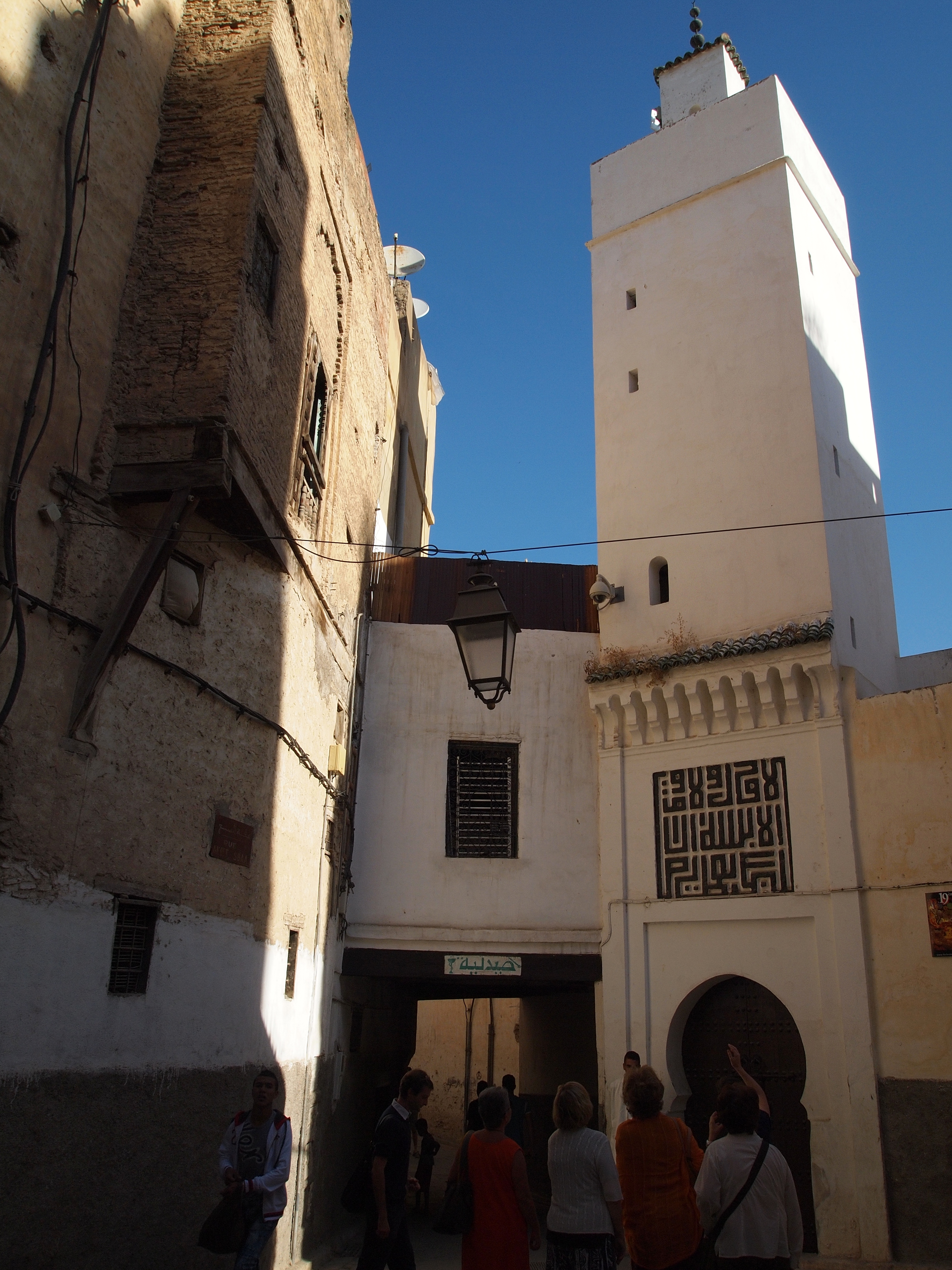
Mzellja Mosque, with a decorative panel of square Kufic above its entrance (right)

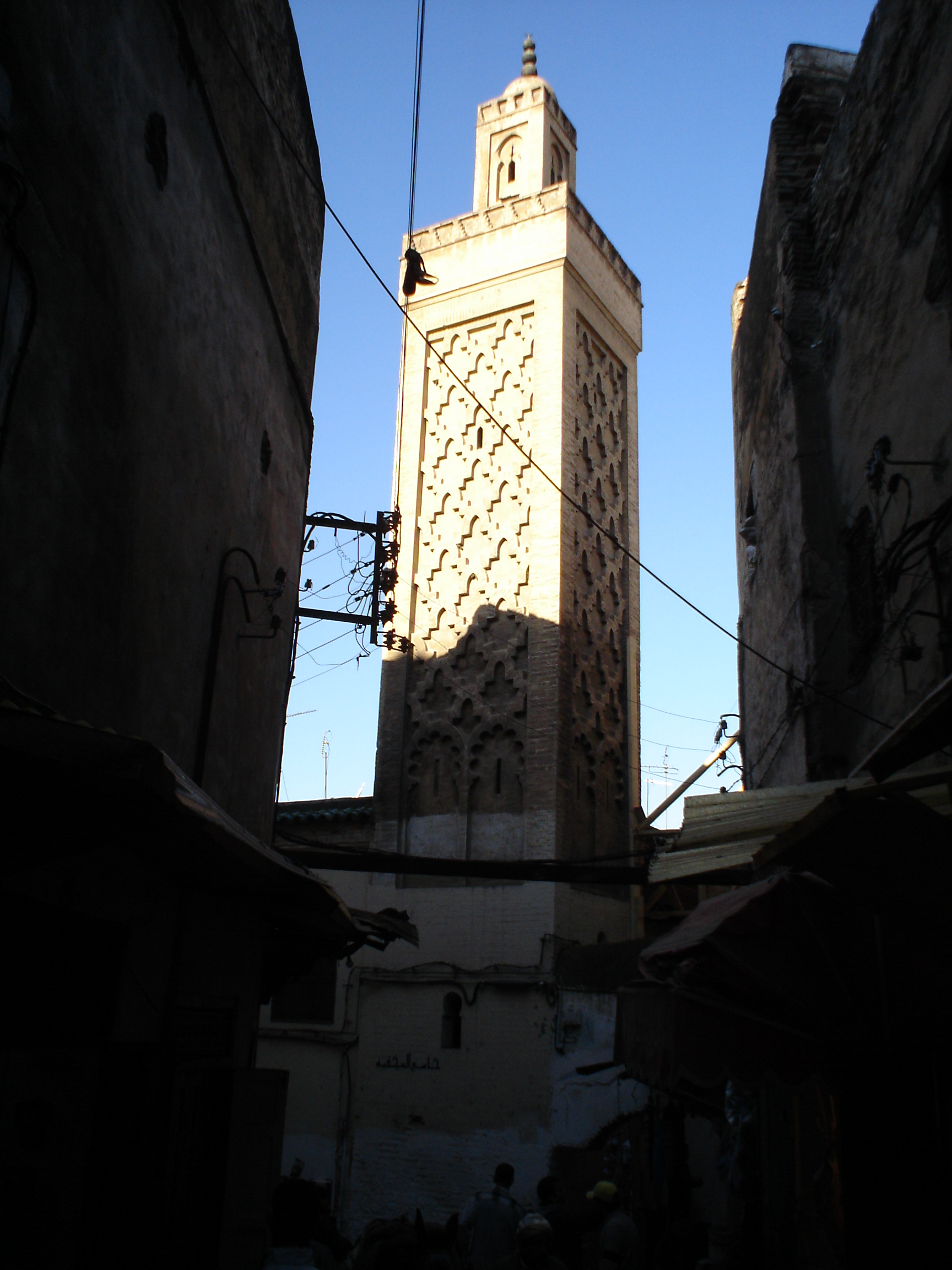
Minaret of the Derb esh-Sheikh Mosque

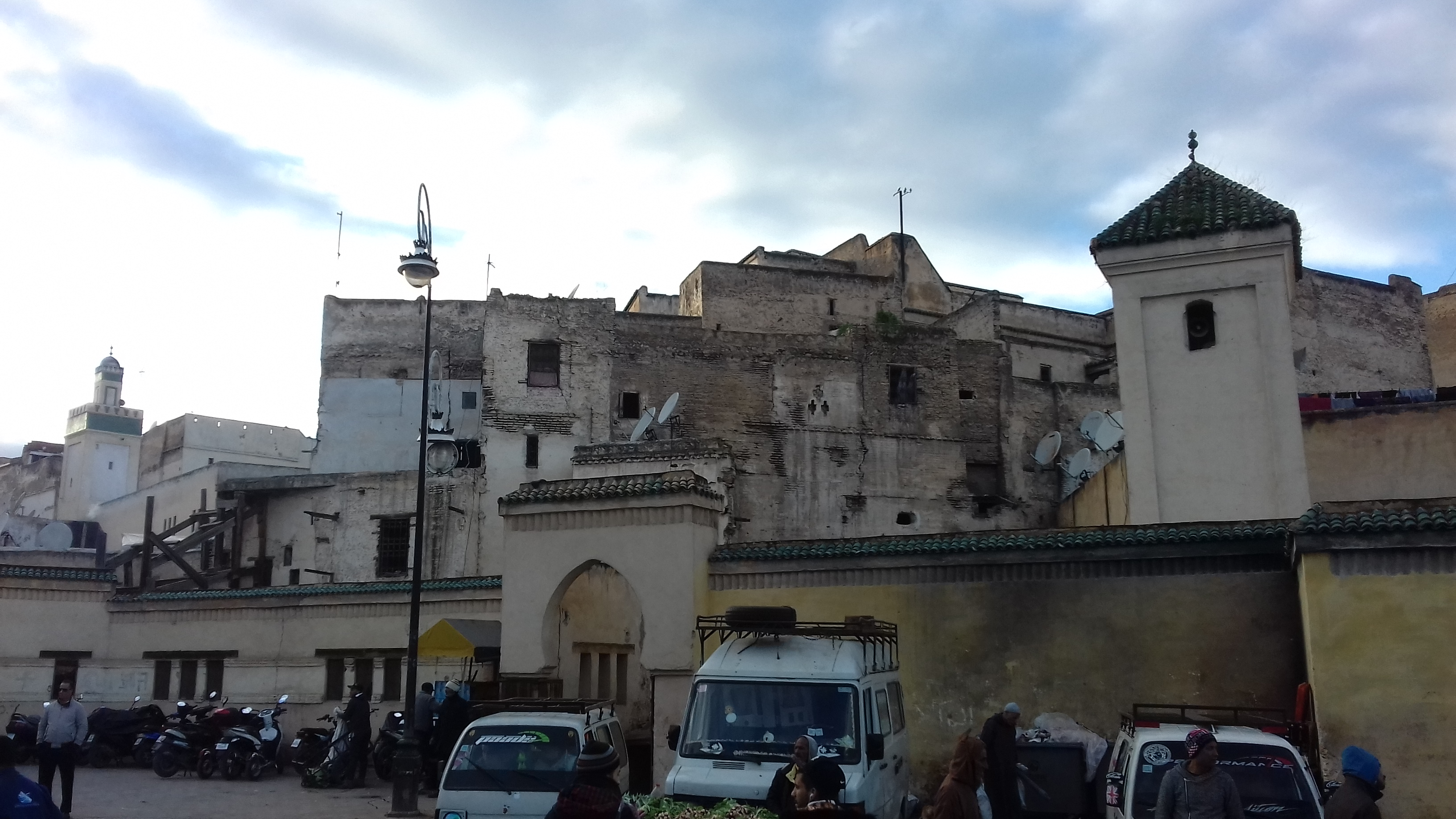
The very simple minaret (right) of the Zellja Mosque, a local neighbourhood mosque

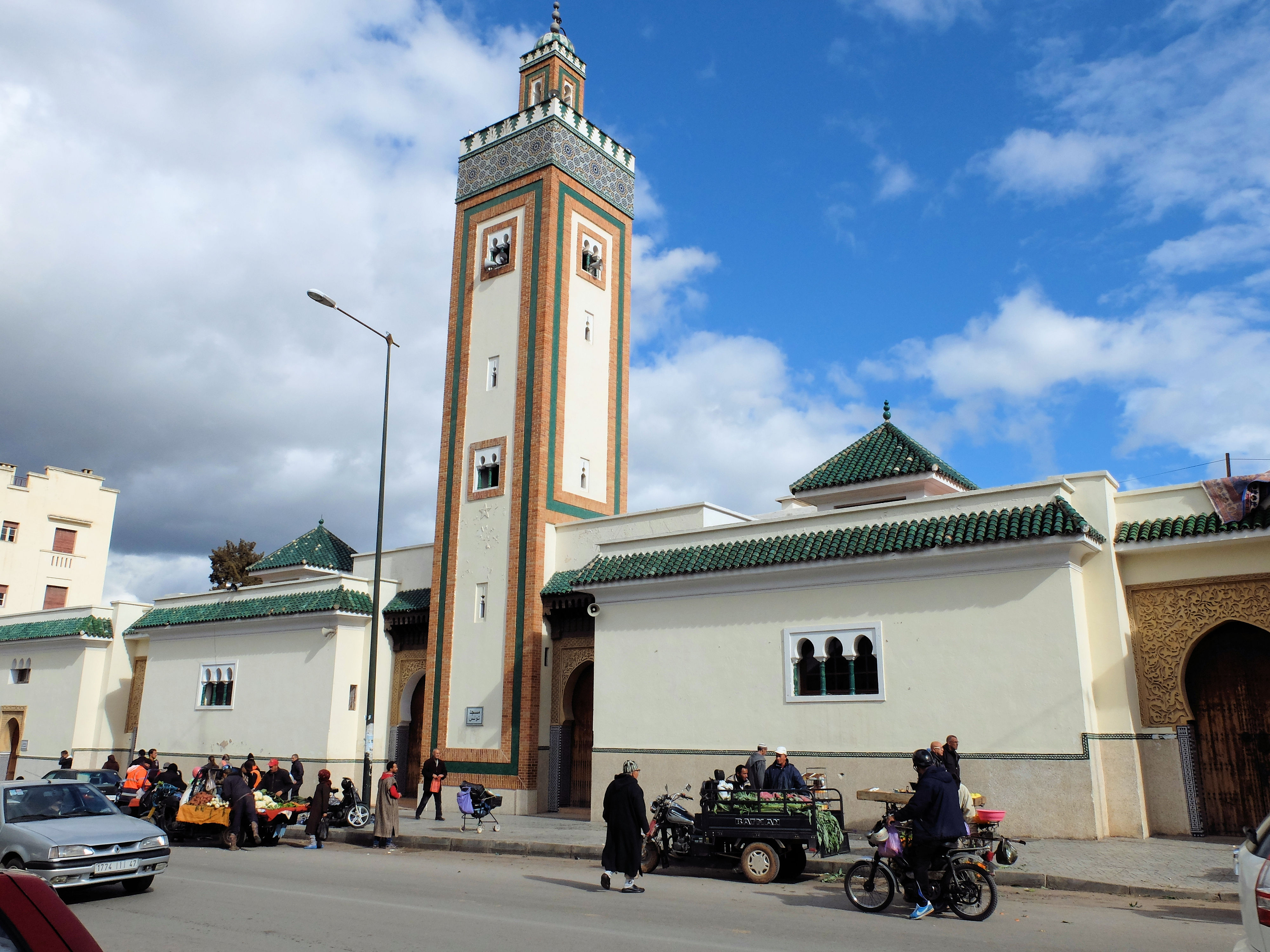
The Tunis Mosque in the Ville Nouvelle (New City), a 20th-century mosque

=== Synagogues ===
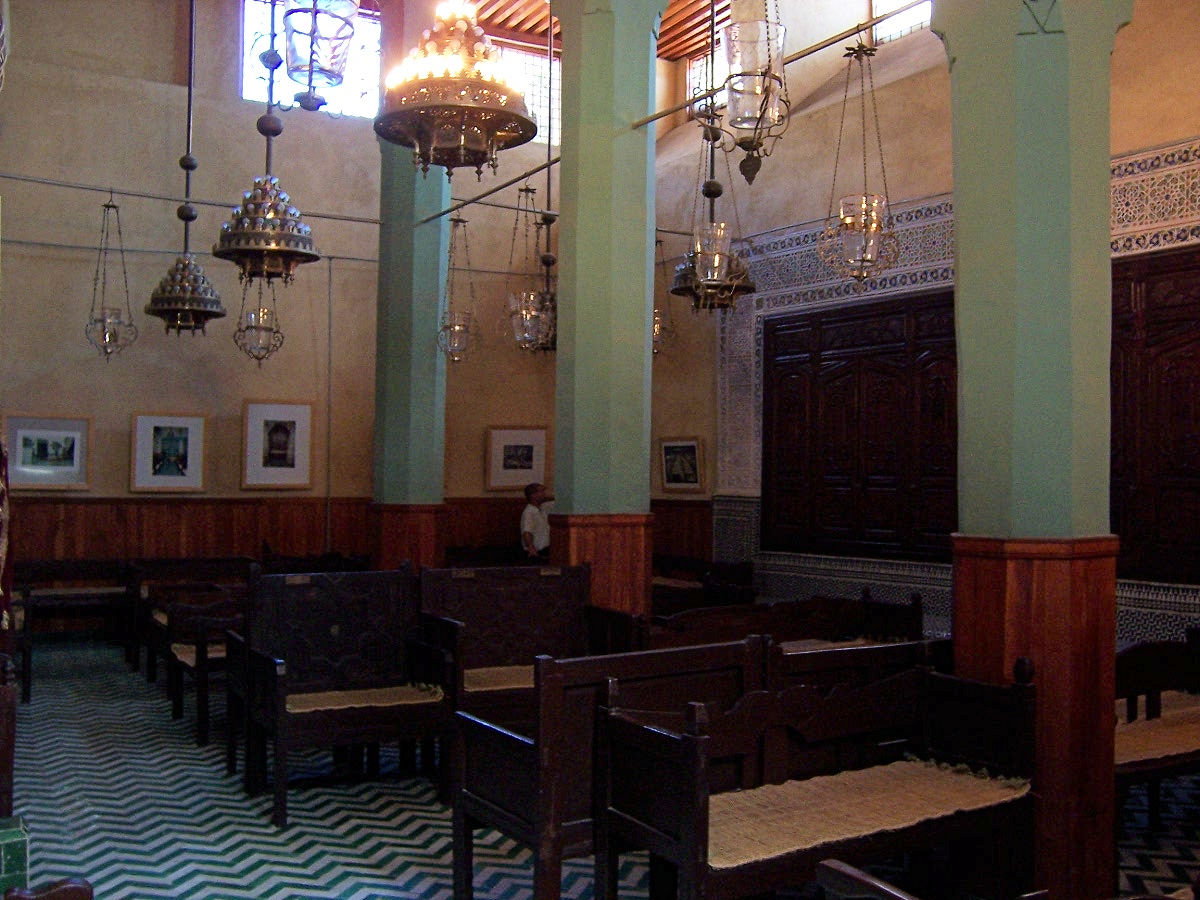
Ibn Danan Synagogue (founded in 17th century but later rebuilt)

The Mellah (Jewish quarter) of Fez Jdid is the site of the 17th-century Ibn Danan Synagogue, the Slat al-Fassiyin Synagogue, and multiple other synagogues, though none of them are functioning today. Synagogues had a very different layout from mosques but often shared similar decorative trends as the rest of Moroccan architecture, such as colourful tilework and carved stucco.

=== Madrasas ===
The madrasa was an institution which originated in northeastern Iran by the early 11th century and was progressively adopted further west. These establishments provided higher education and served to train Islamic scholars, particularly in Islamic law and jurisprudence (fiqh). The madrasa in the Sunni world was generally antithetical to more "heterodox" religious doctrines, including the doctrine espoused by the Almohad dynasty. As such, it only came to flourish in Morocco in the late 13th century, under the Marinid dynasty which succeeded the Almohads. To the Marinids, madrasas also played a part in bolstering the political legitimacy of their dynasty. They used this patronage to encourage the loyalty of the country's influential but independent religious elites and also to portray themselves to the general population as protectors and promoters of orthodox Sunni Islam. Finally, madrasas also played an important role in training the scholars and elites who operated the state bureaucracy. Fez has traditionally retained an influential position as a religious capital in the region, exemplified by the famous University of al-Qarawiyyin. Madrasas played a supporting role to this major institution, in part because, unlike the mosque, they provided accommodations for students who came from outside the city.

Madrasas were generally centered around a main courtyard with a central fountain, off which other rooms could be accessed. Student living quarters were typically distributed on an upper floor around the courtyard. Many madrasas also included a prayer hall with a mihrab. In the Marinid era, madrasas also evolved to be lavishly decorated. However, the madrasas were also teaching institutions in their own right and offered their own courses, with some Islamic scholars making their reputation by teaching at certain madrasas.

The first formal madrasa was the Saffarin Madrasa in Fes el Bali by Sultan Abu Yusuf in 1271. Sultan Abu al-Hasan was the most prolific patron of madrasa construction, completing the Al-Attarine, Mesbahiyya and Sahrij Madrasa in Fez alone, and several other madrasas as well in other cities such as Salé and Meknes. His son Abu Inan Faris built the famed Bou Inania Madrasa, and by the time of his death, every major city in the Marinid Empire had at least one madrasa. The largest madrasa in the heart of the medina is the Cherratine Madrasa commissioned by the Alawi sultan Al-Rashid in 1670.

Madrasas in Fez

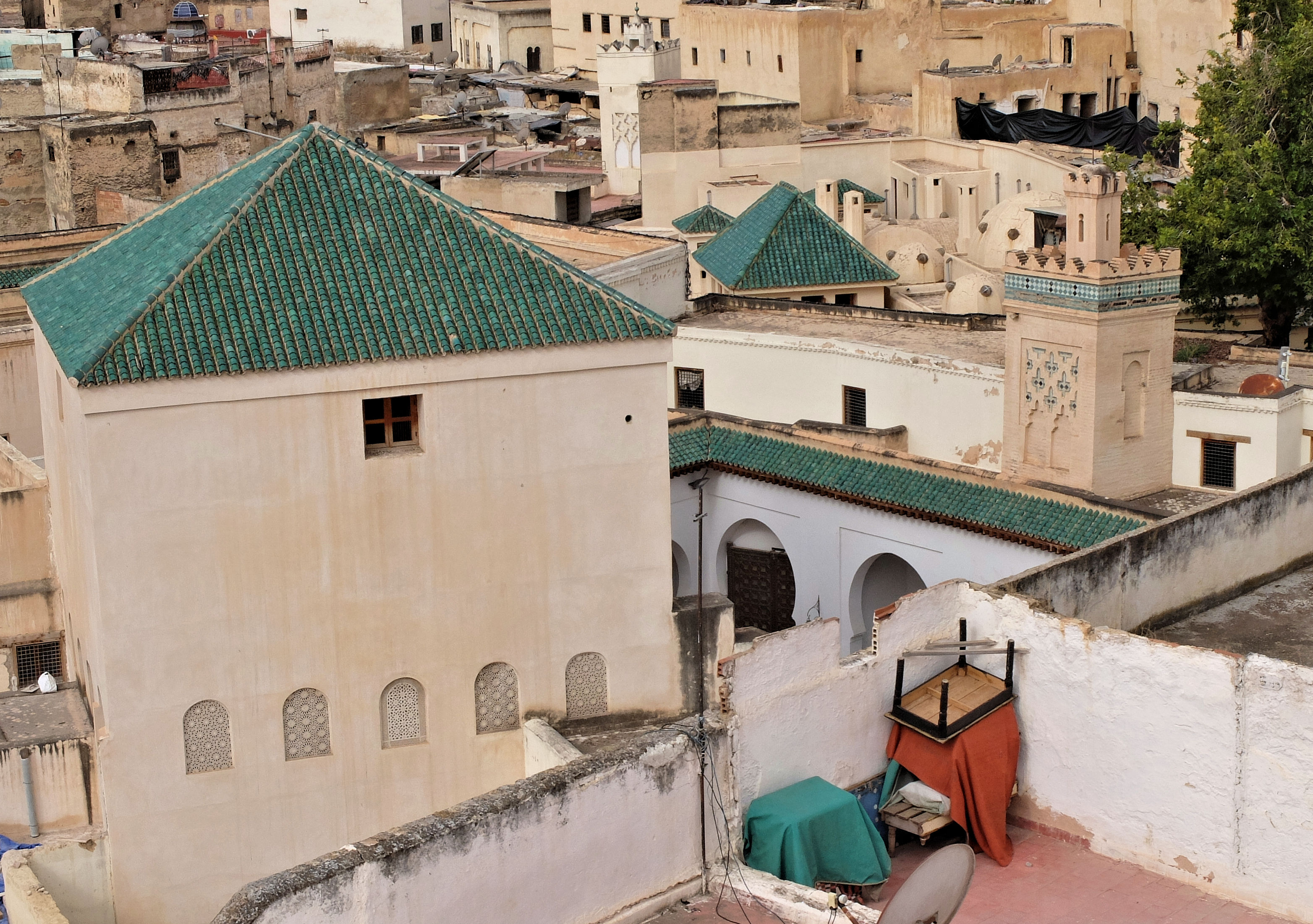
Saffarin Madrasa (dated to 1271); the minaret (right) and prayer hall (left) are visible

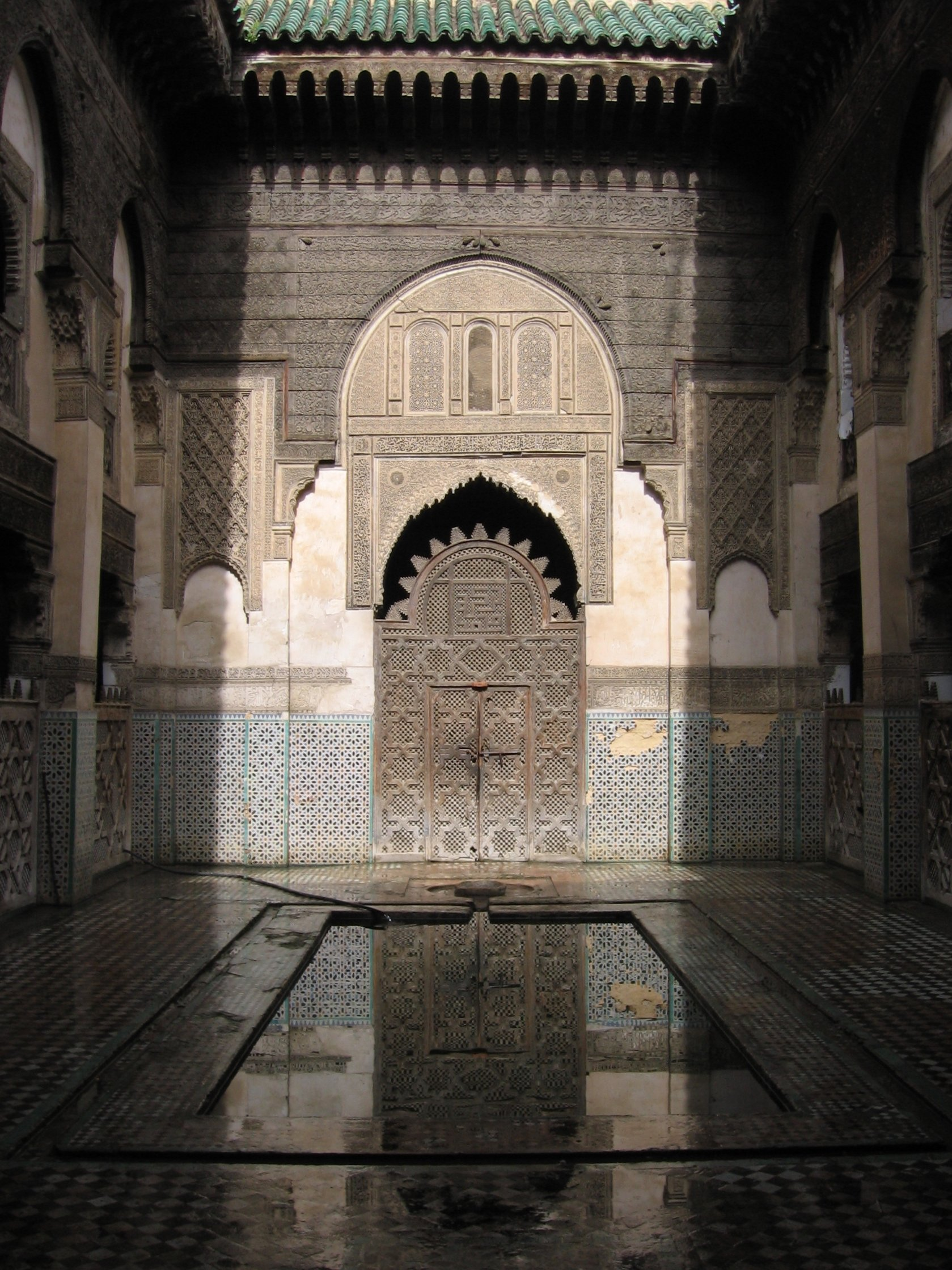
Sahrij Madrasa (built in 1321–1328)

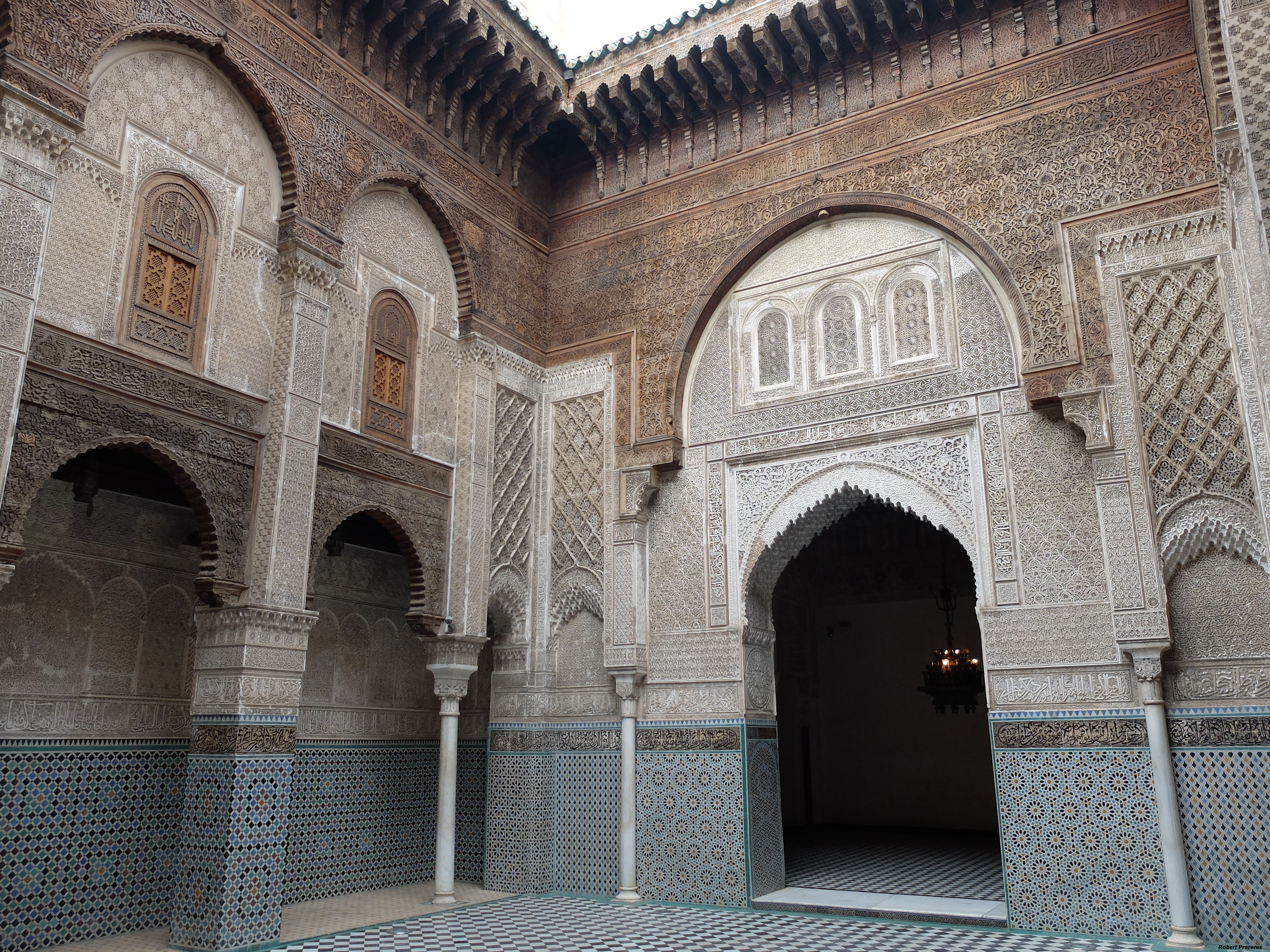
Al-Attarine Madrasa (built in 1323–1325)

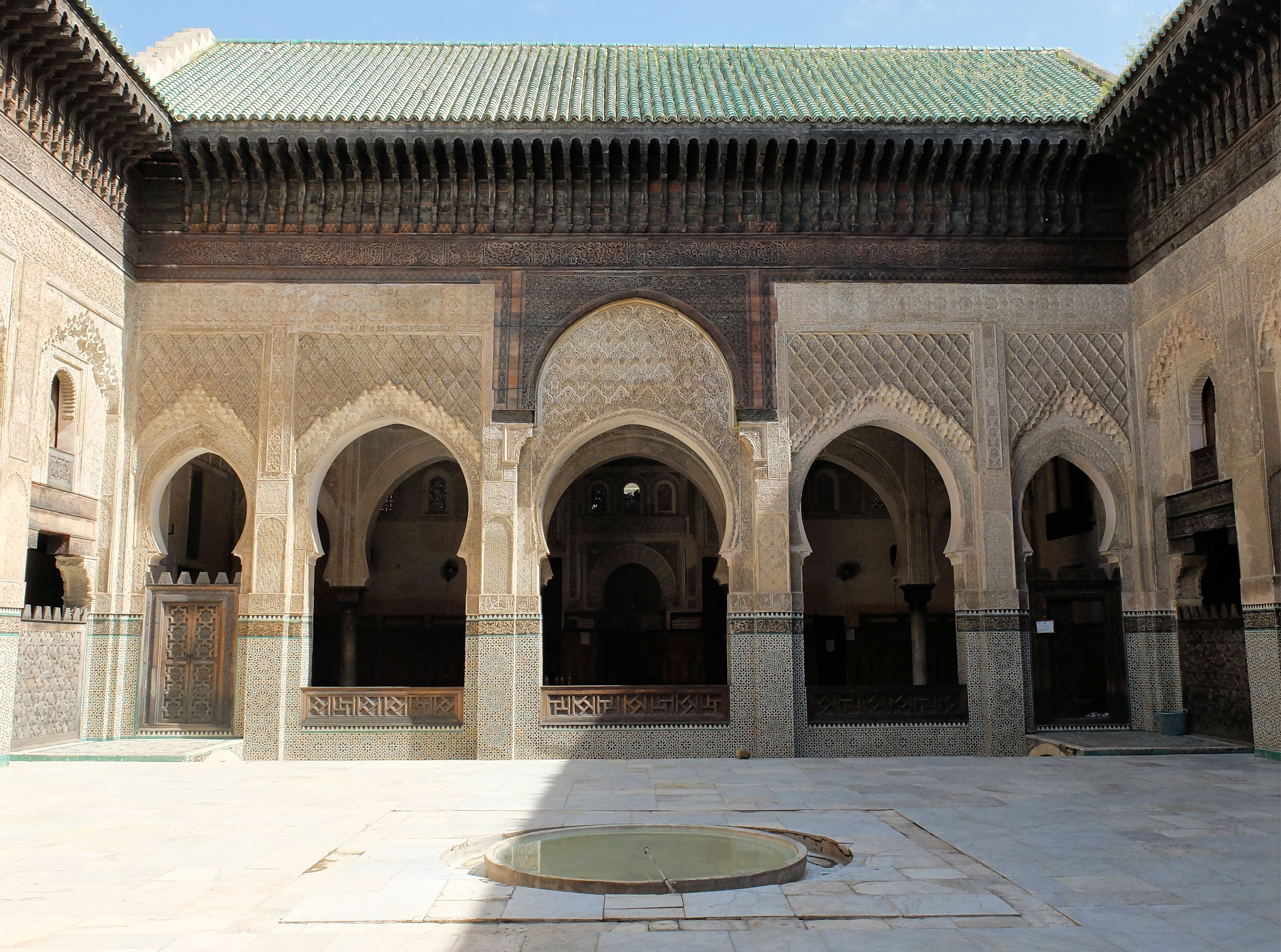
Bou Inania Madrasa (built in 1350–1355)

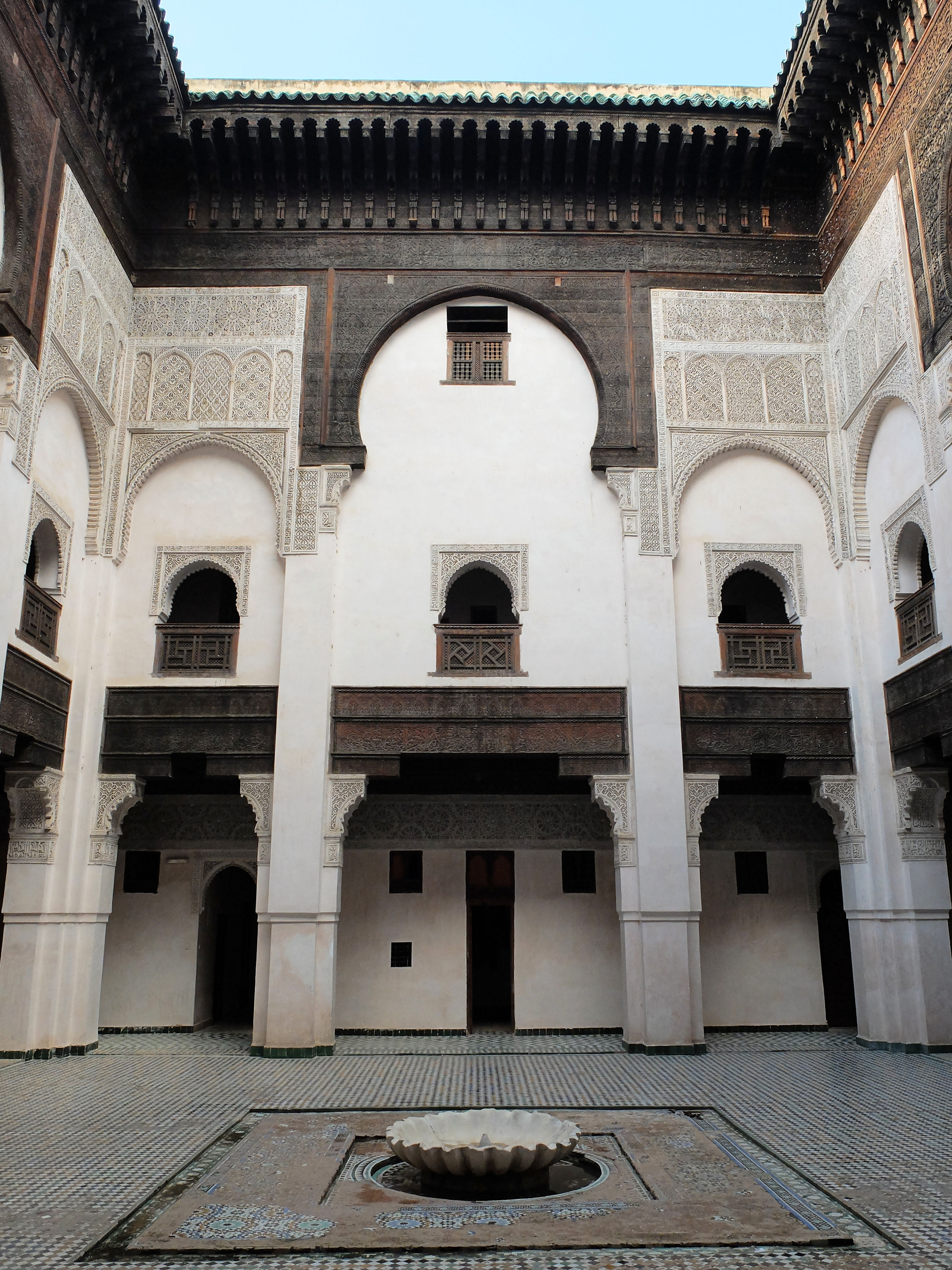
Cherratine Madrasa (founded in 1670)

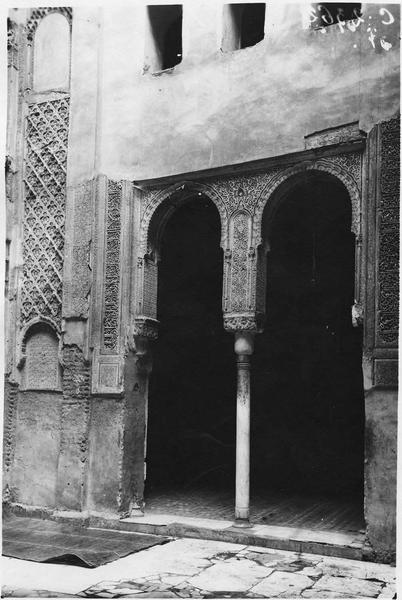
Mesbahiyya Madrasa (completed in 1346; photo from 1916)

=== Tombs, mausoleums, and zawiyas ===
Located in the heart of Fes el Bali, the Zawiya of Moulay Idriss II is a zawiya (a shrine and religious complex; also spelled zaouia), dedicated to and containing the tomb of Idris II (or Moulay Idris II when including his sharifian title) who is considered the main founder of the city of Fez. Another well-known and important zawiya is the Zawiyia of Sidi Ahmed al-Tijani, which commemorates Sidi Ahmed al-Tijani, the founder of Tijaniyyah tariqa from the 18th century. A number of zawiyas are scattered elsewhere across the city, many containing the tombs of important Sufi saints or scholars, such as the Zawiya of Sidi Abdelkader al-Fassi, the Zawiya of Sidi Ahmed esh-Shawi, and the Zawiya of Sidi Taoudi Ben Souda.

The old city also has several major historic cemeteries which existed outside the main city gates, namely the cemeteries of Bab Ftouh (the most significant), Bab Mahrouk, and Bab Guissa. Some of these cemeteries include marabouts or domed structures containing the tombs of local Muslim saints (often considered Sufis). One of the most important ones is the Marabout of Sidi Harazem in the Bab Ftouh Cemetery. To the north, near the Bab Guissa Cemetery, there are also the Marinid Tombs built during the 14th century as a necropolis for the Marinid sultans, ruined today but still a well-known landmark of the city.

Tombs and zawiyas in Fez

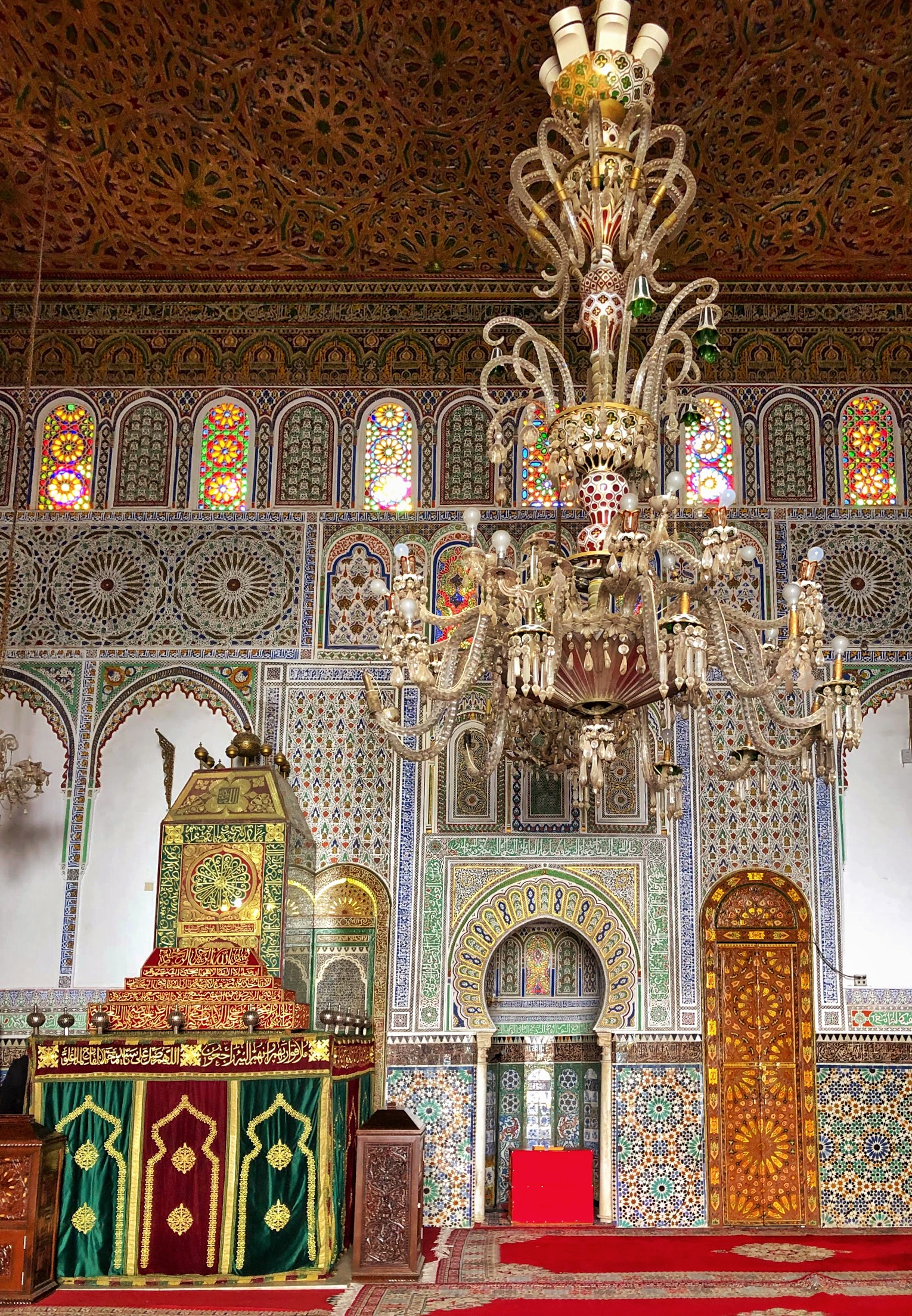
Interior of the Mausoleum of Moulay Idris II, part of a zawiya around the tomb of Idris II

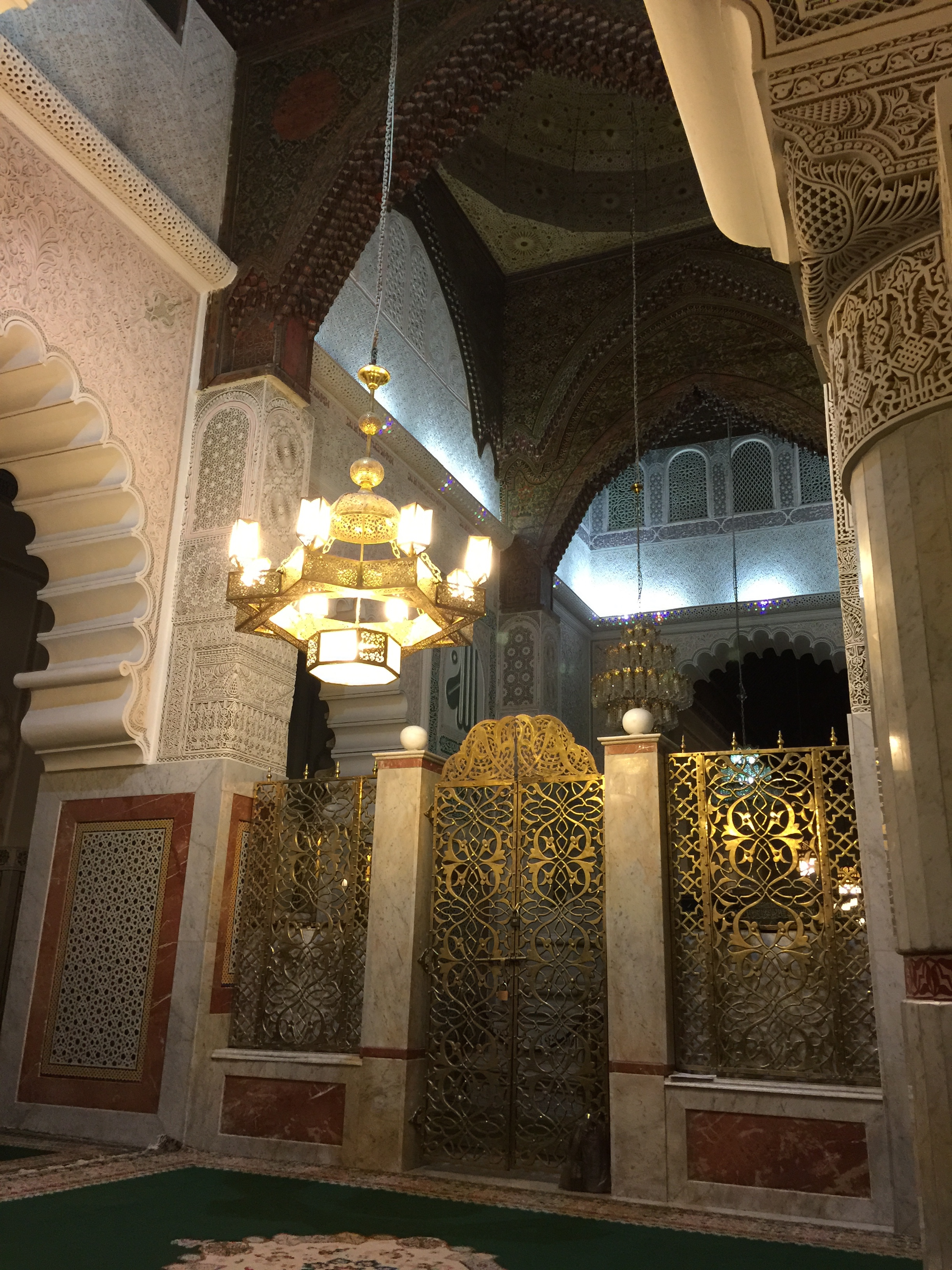
Interior of the Zawiya of Sidi Ahmed al-Tijani, the burial site of the 18th-century Sufi sheikh Ahmad al-Tijani

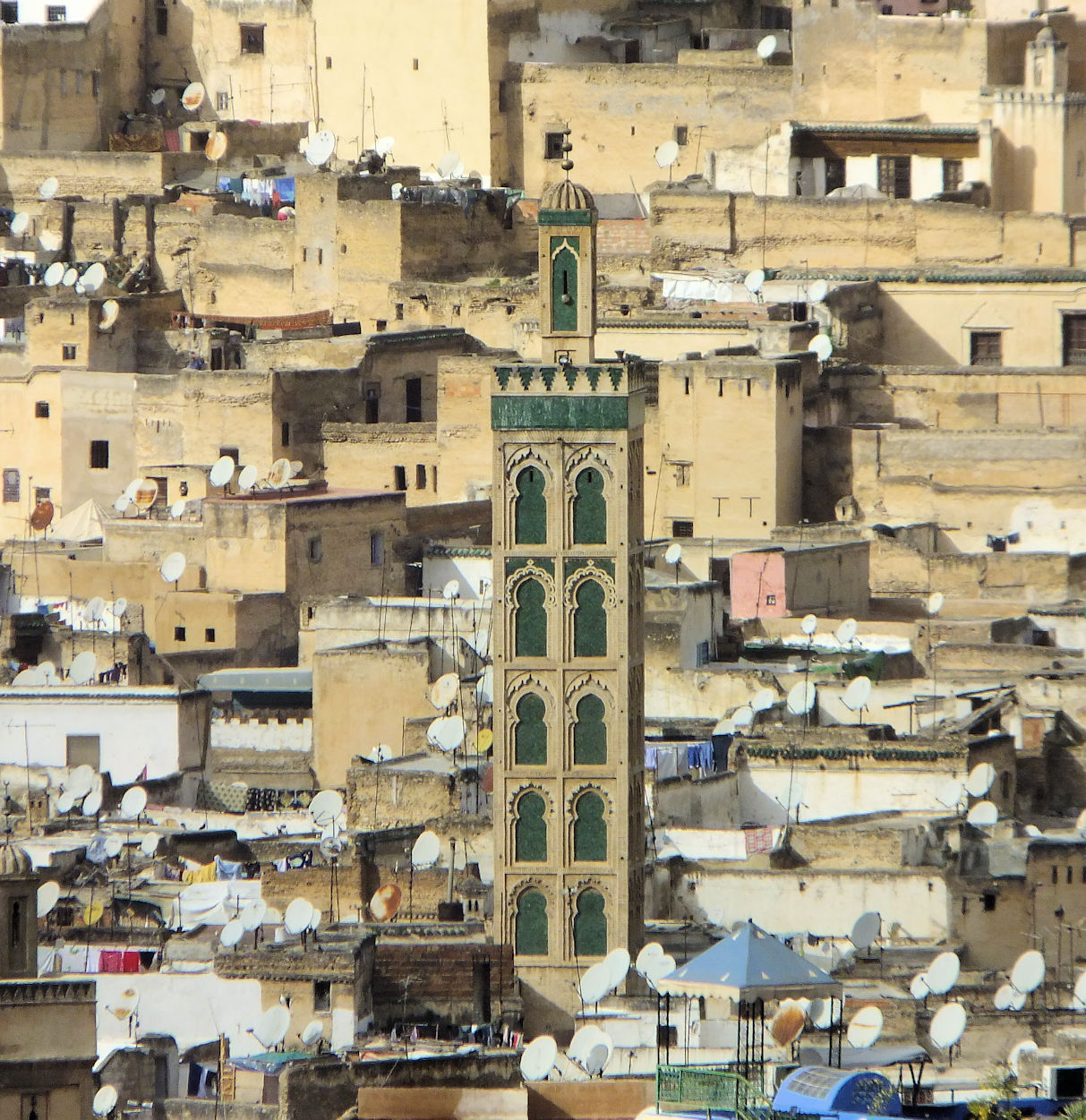
Minaret of the Zawiya of Sidi Abdelkader al-Fassi (established in the 17th century, expanded afterward)

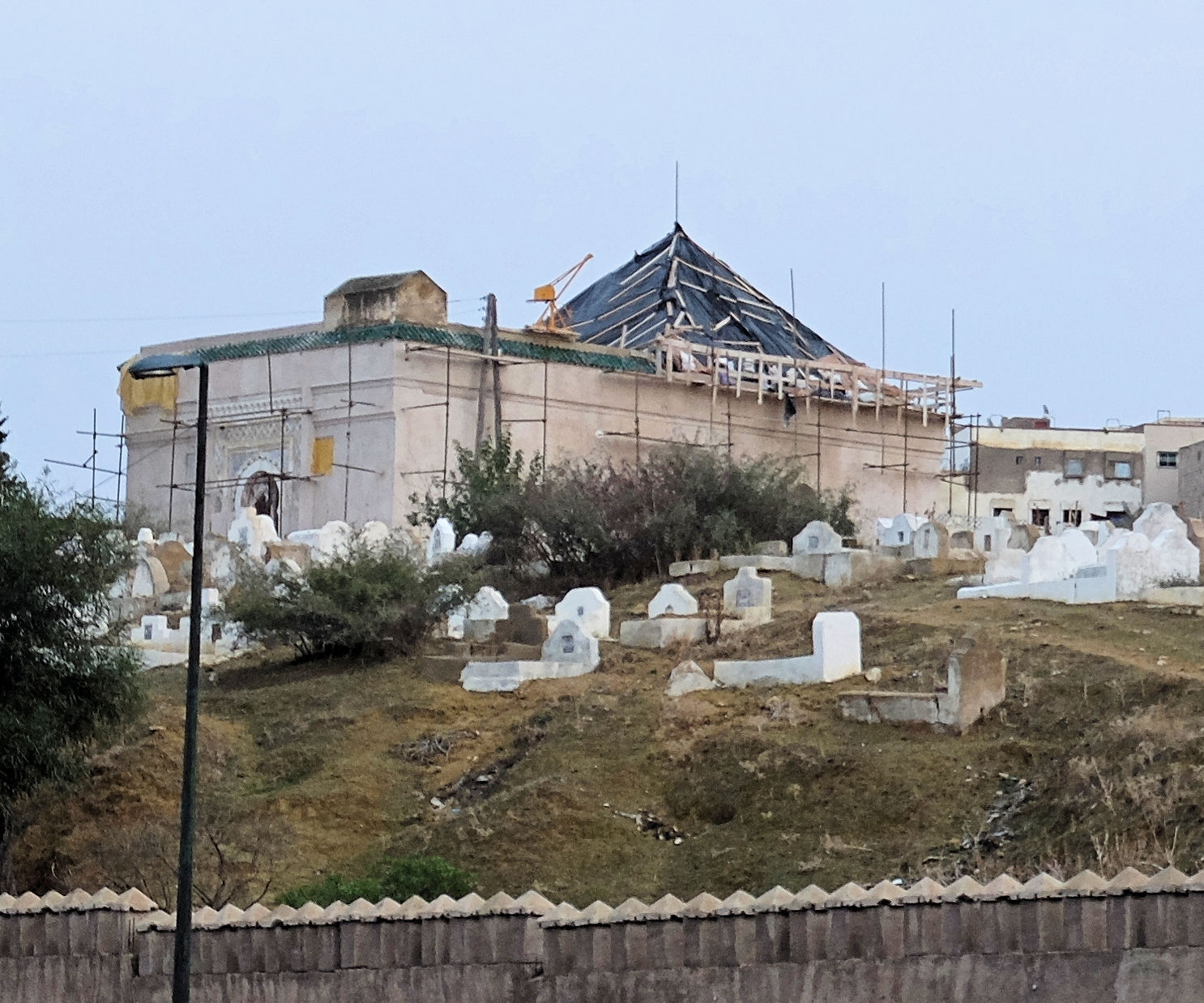
Mausoleum of Sidi Harazem (current structure from the 18th century; photo taken during recent restorations)

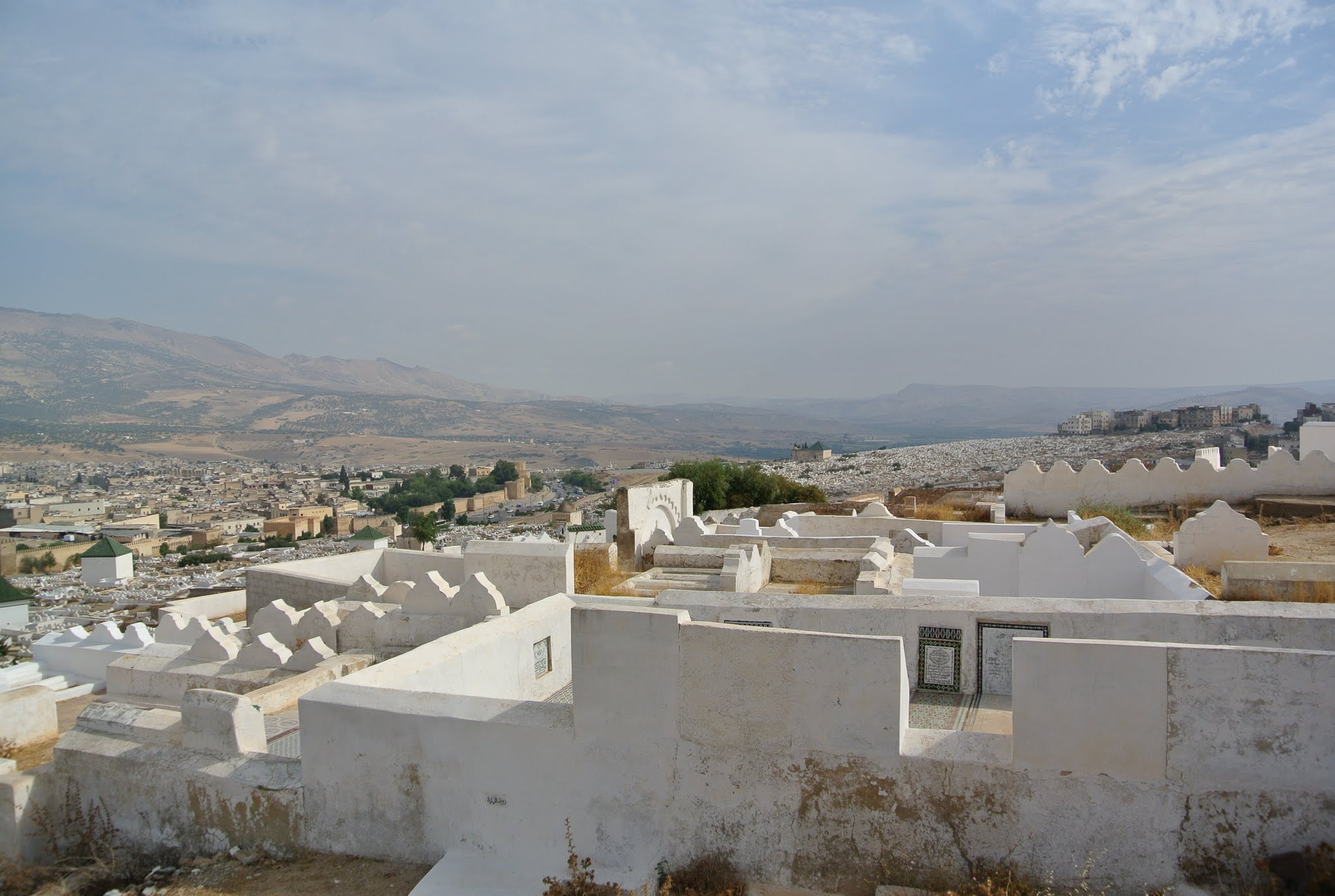
The cemetery of Bab Ftouh, the largest of the old city

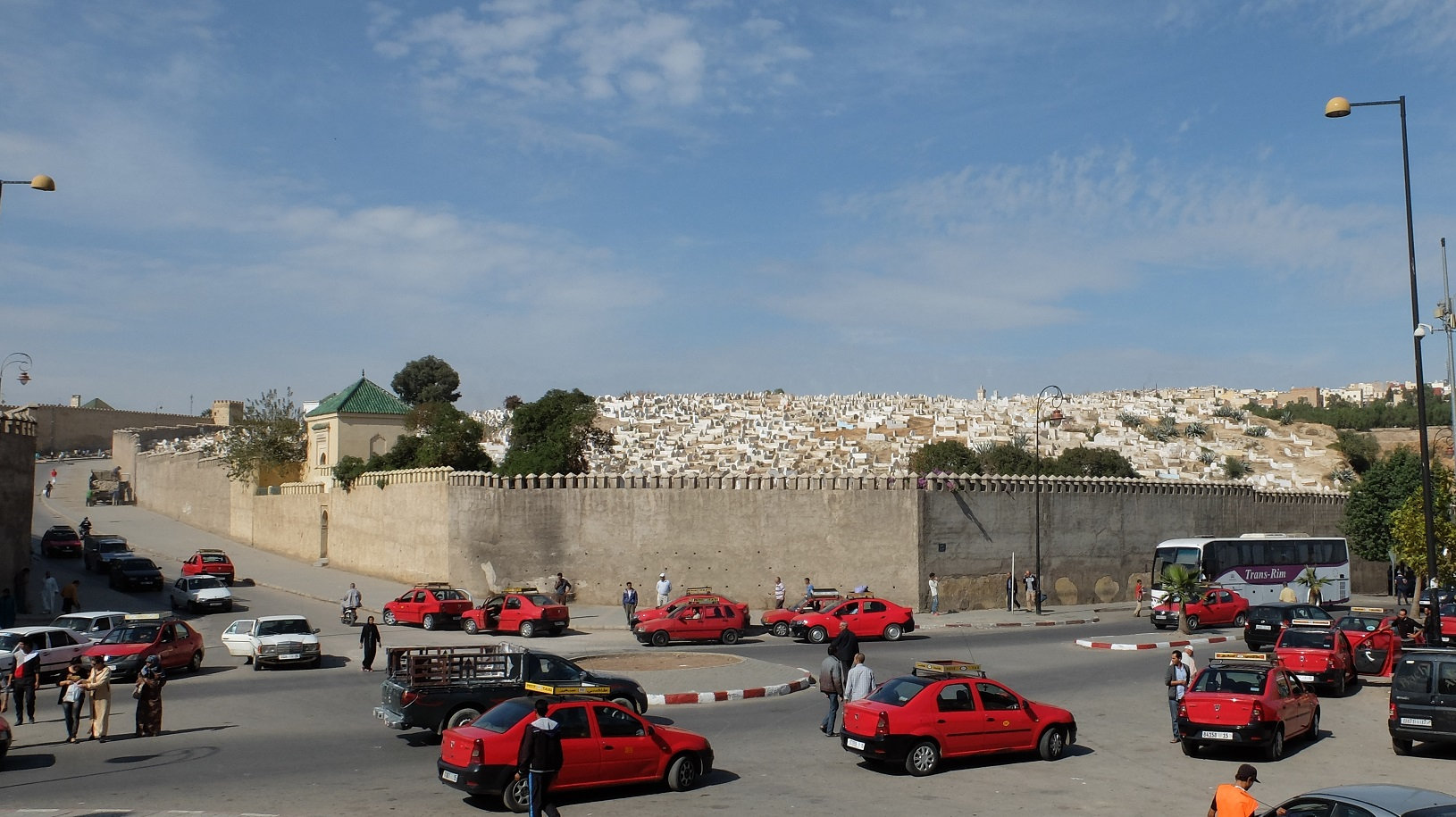
The cemetery of Bab Mahrouk

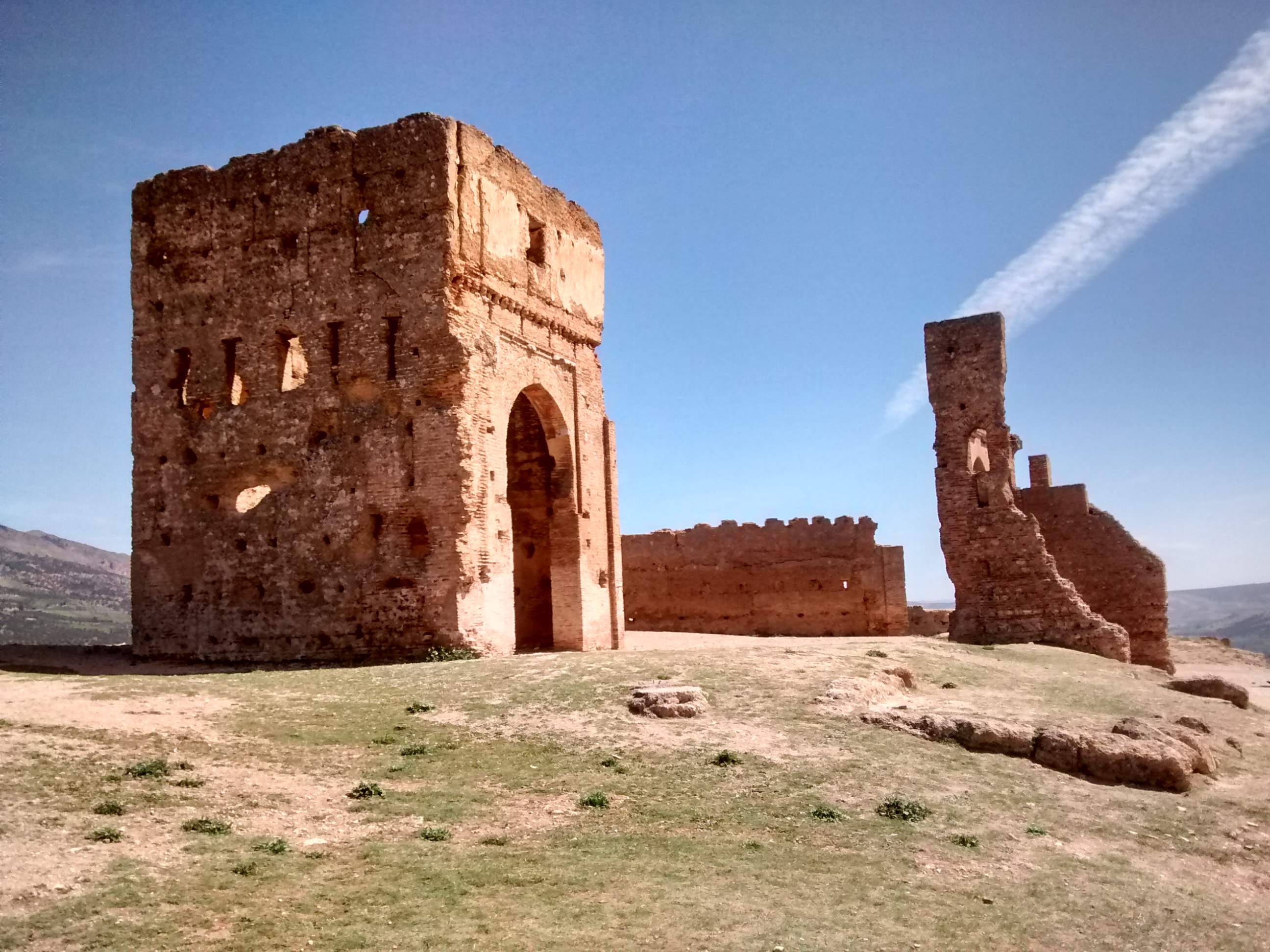
Remains of the Marinid Tombs

=== Funduqs (historic merchant buildings) ===
The old city of Fez includes more than a hundred funduqs or foundouks (traditional inns, or urban caravanserais). These were commercial structures which provided lodging for merchants and travelers or housed the workshops of artisans. They also frequently served as venues for other commercial activities such as markets and auctions. One of the most famous is the Funduq al-Najjarin, which was built in the 18th century by Amin Adiyil to provide accommodation and storage for merchants and which now houses the Nejjarine Museum of Wooden Arts & Crafts. Other major examples include the Funduq Shamma'in (also spelled Foundouk Chemmaïne) and the Funduq Staouniyyin (or "Funduq of the Tetouanis"), both dating from the Marinid era or earlier, and the Funduq Sagha which is contemporary with the Funduq al-Najjarin.

Funduqs in Fez

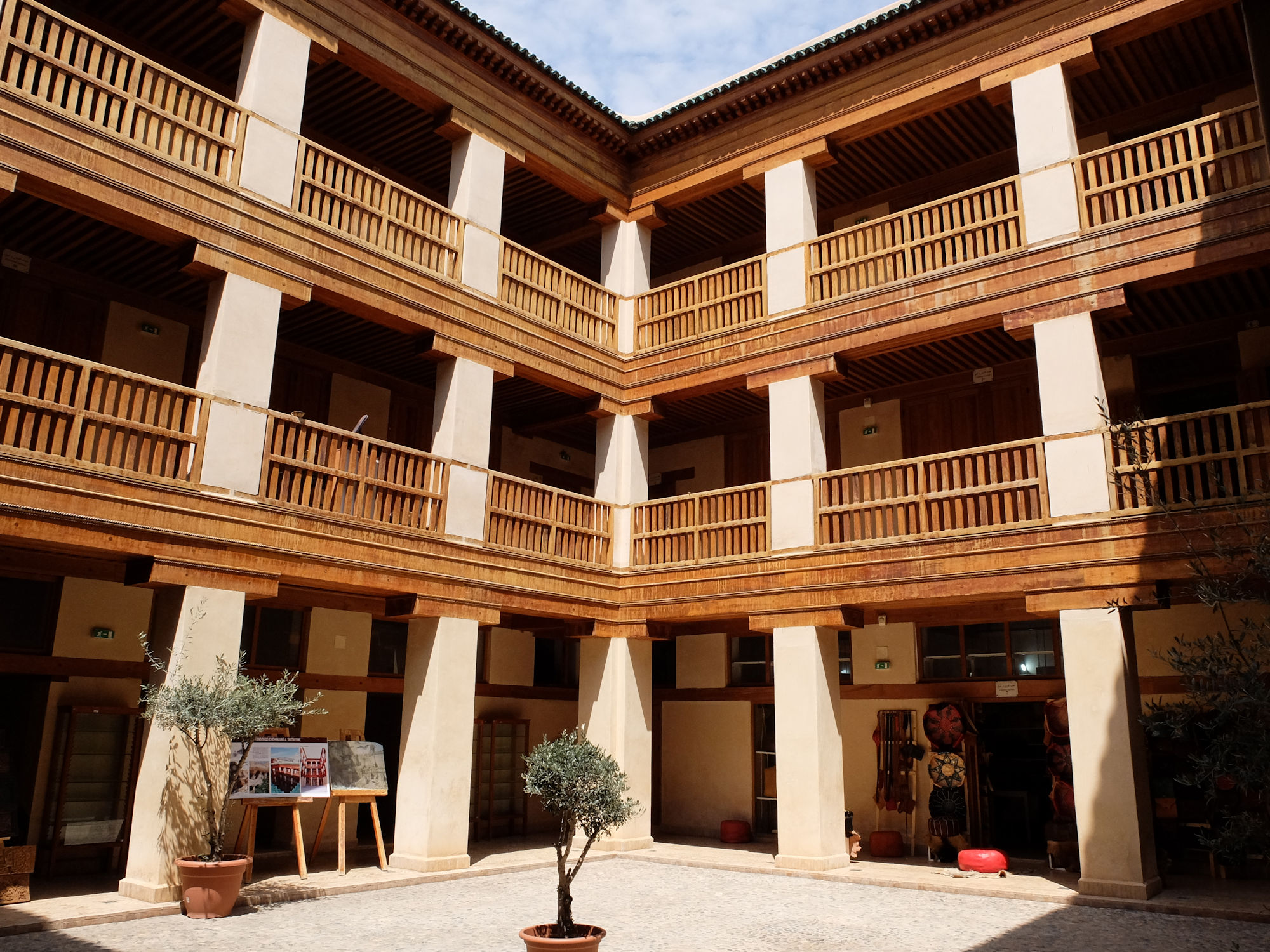
Funduq Shamma'in (founded in the 13th century or earlier)

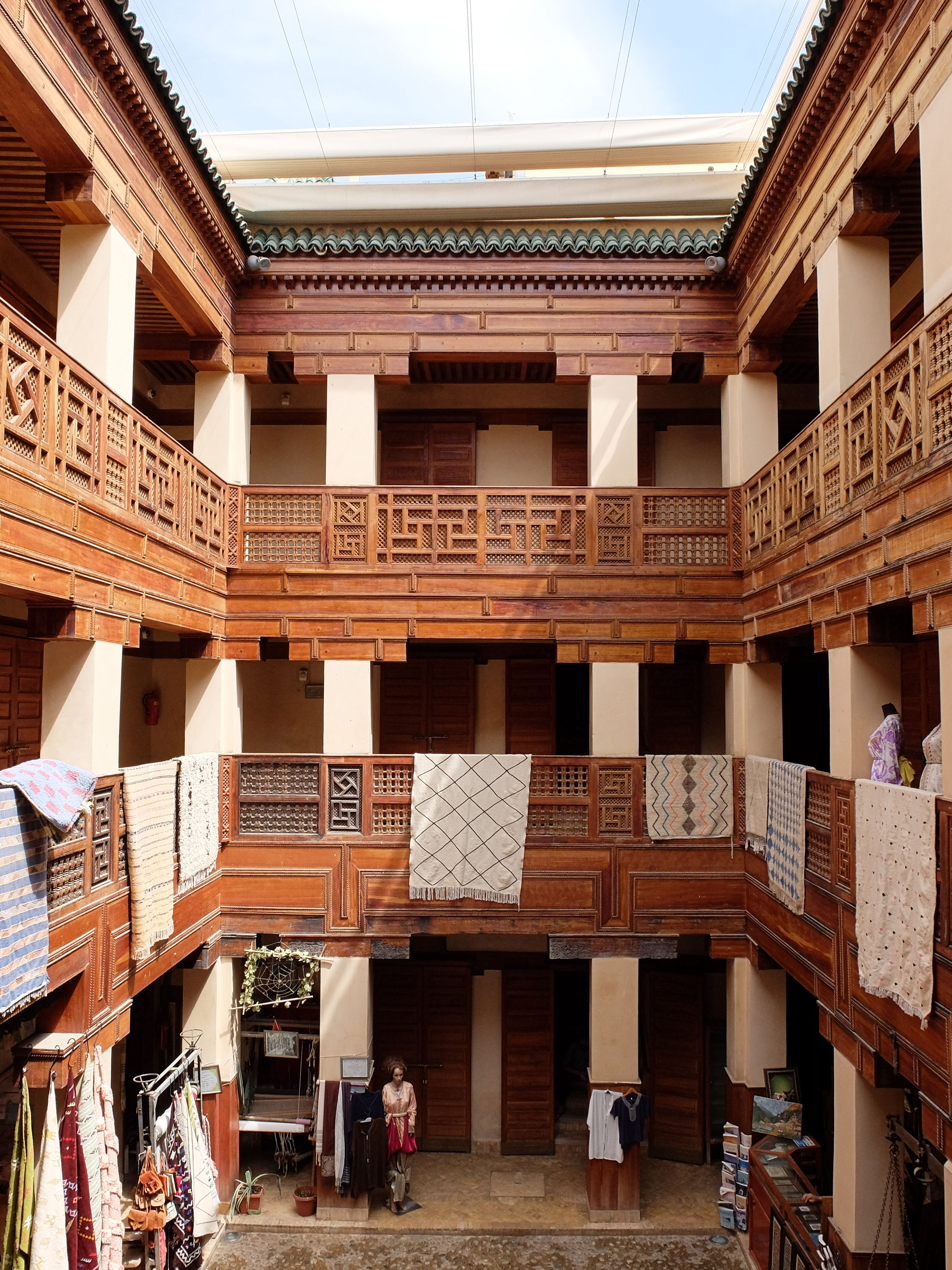
Funduq Staouniyyin (or Funduq al-Tetwaniyyin), founded in 14th century

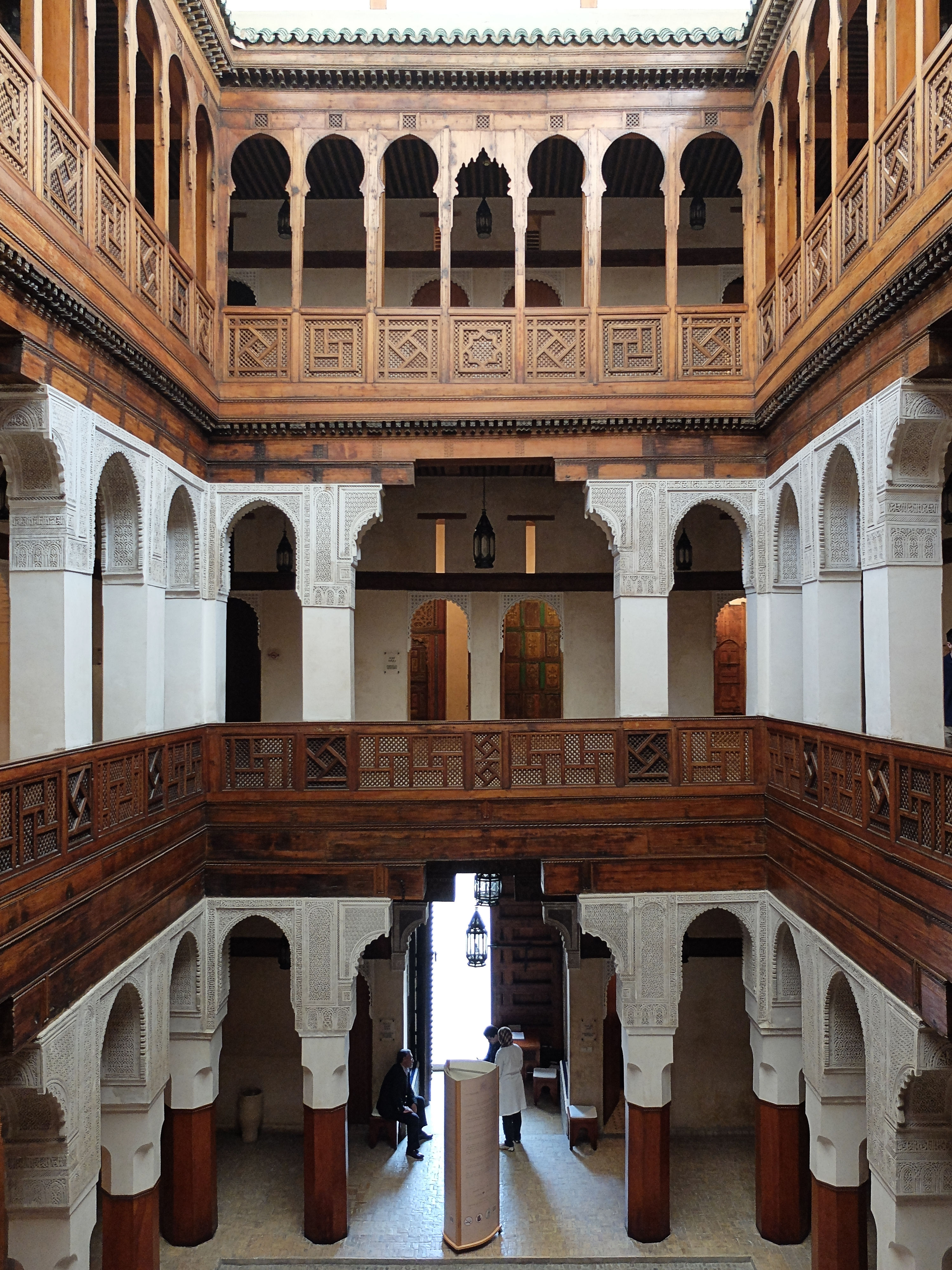
Funduq al-Najjarin (built in 1711; currently the Nejjarine Museum of Wooden Arts & Crafts)

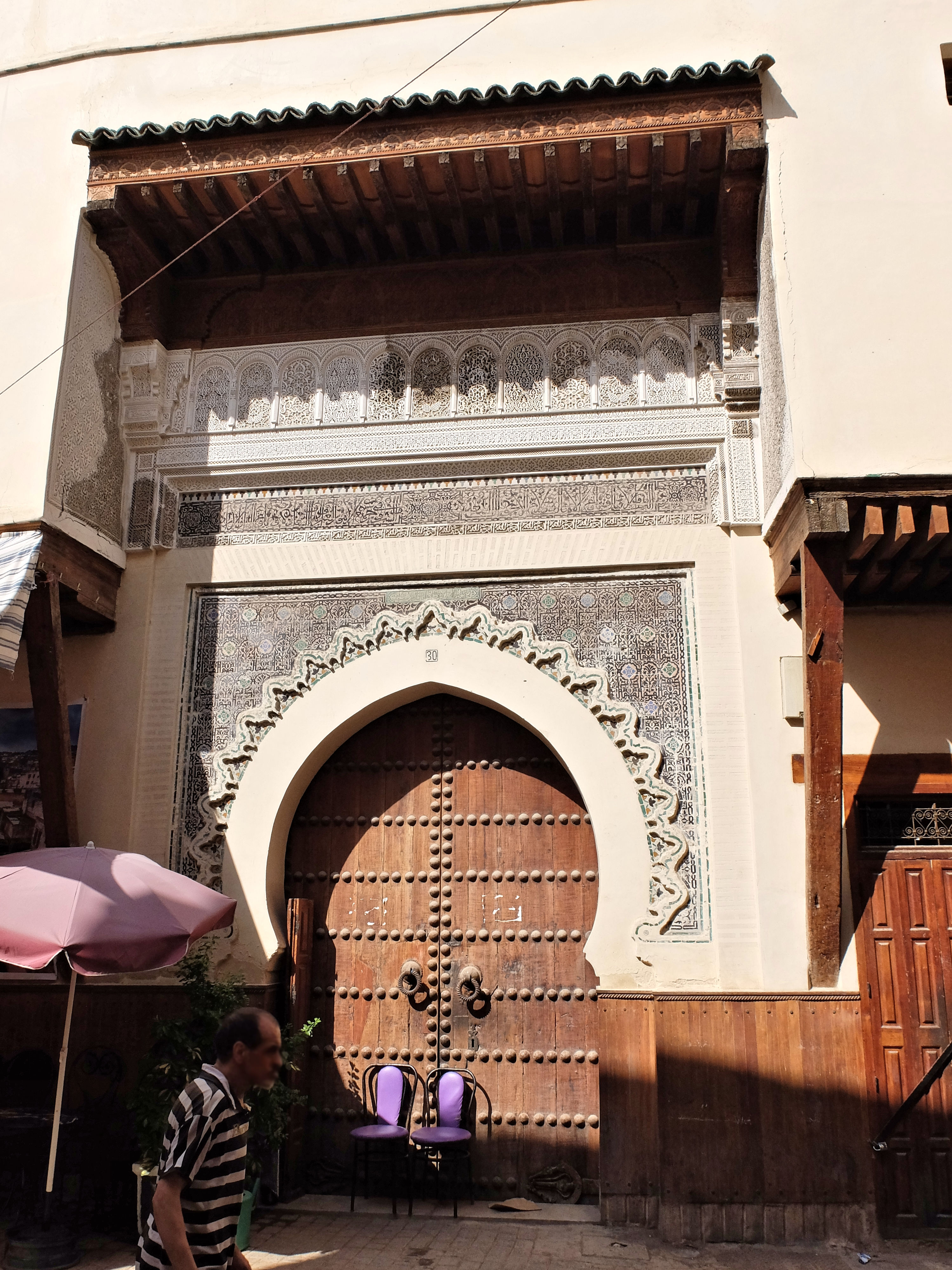
Entrance of the Funduq Sagha (also built in 1711)

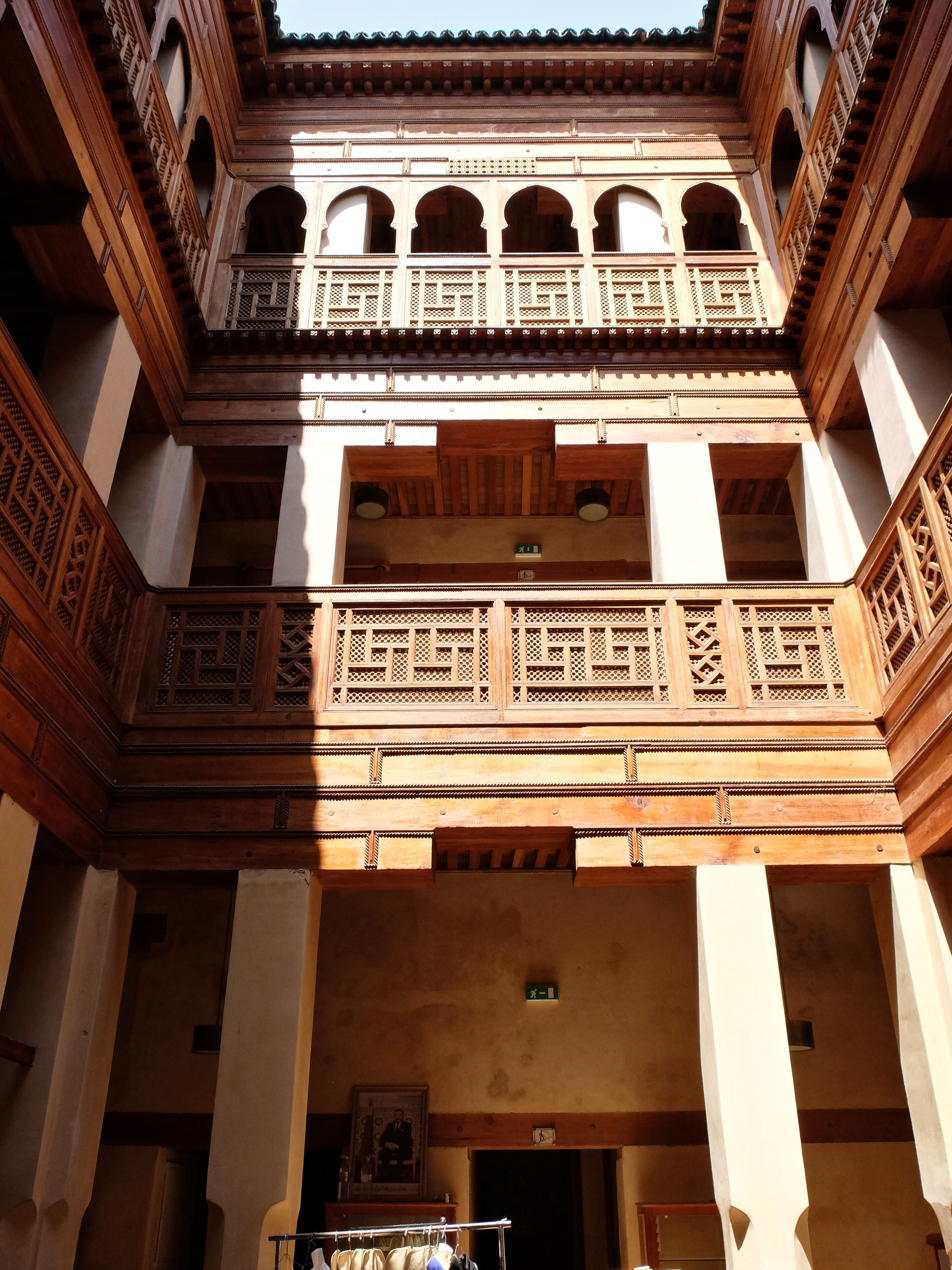
Funduq Barka (18th century)

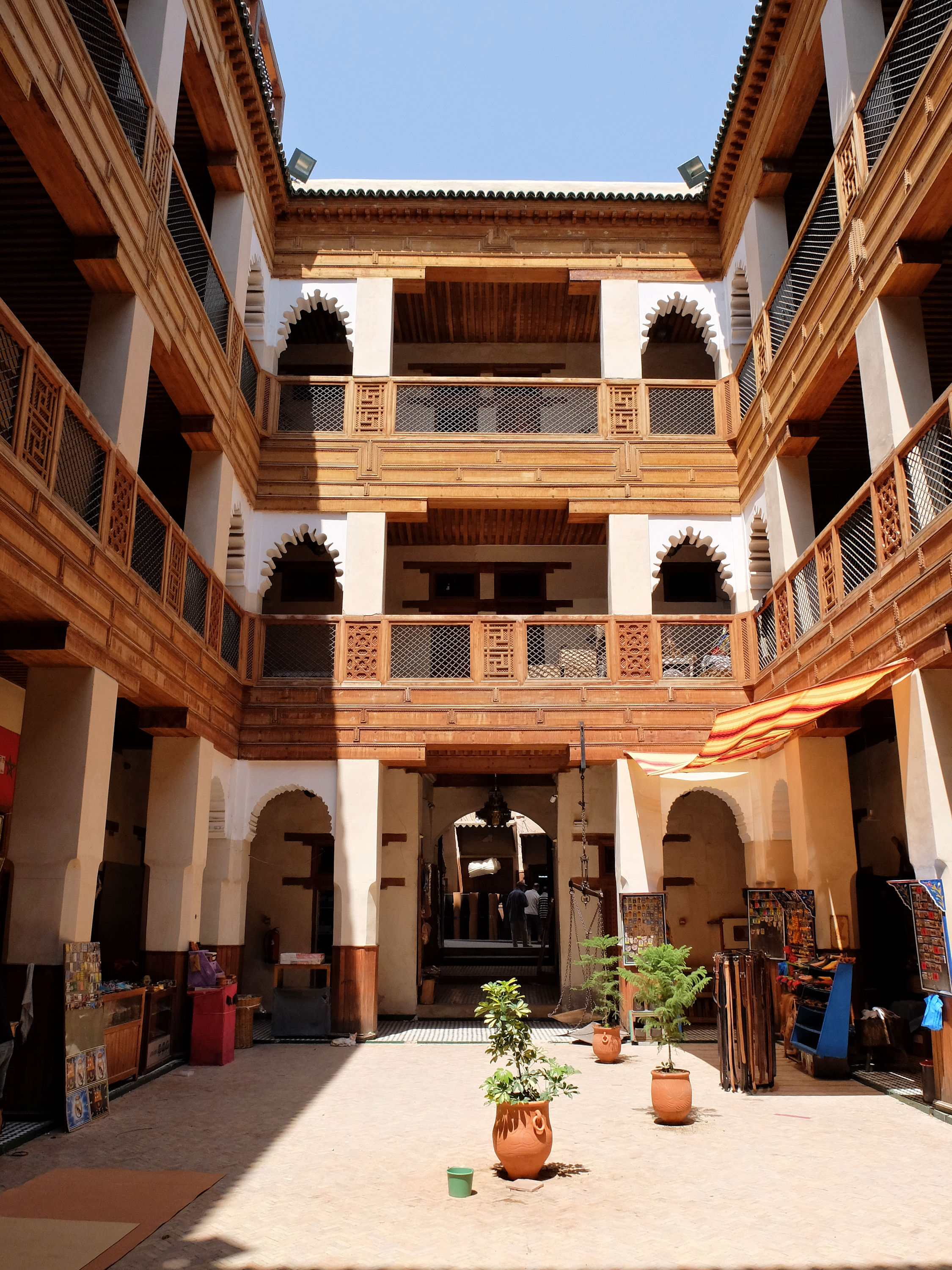
Funduq Kettanin (late 19th century)

=== Hammams (bathhouses) ===
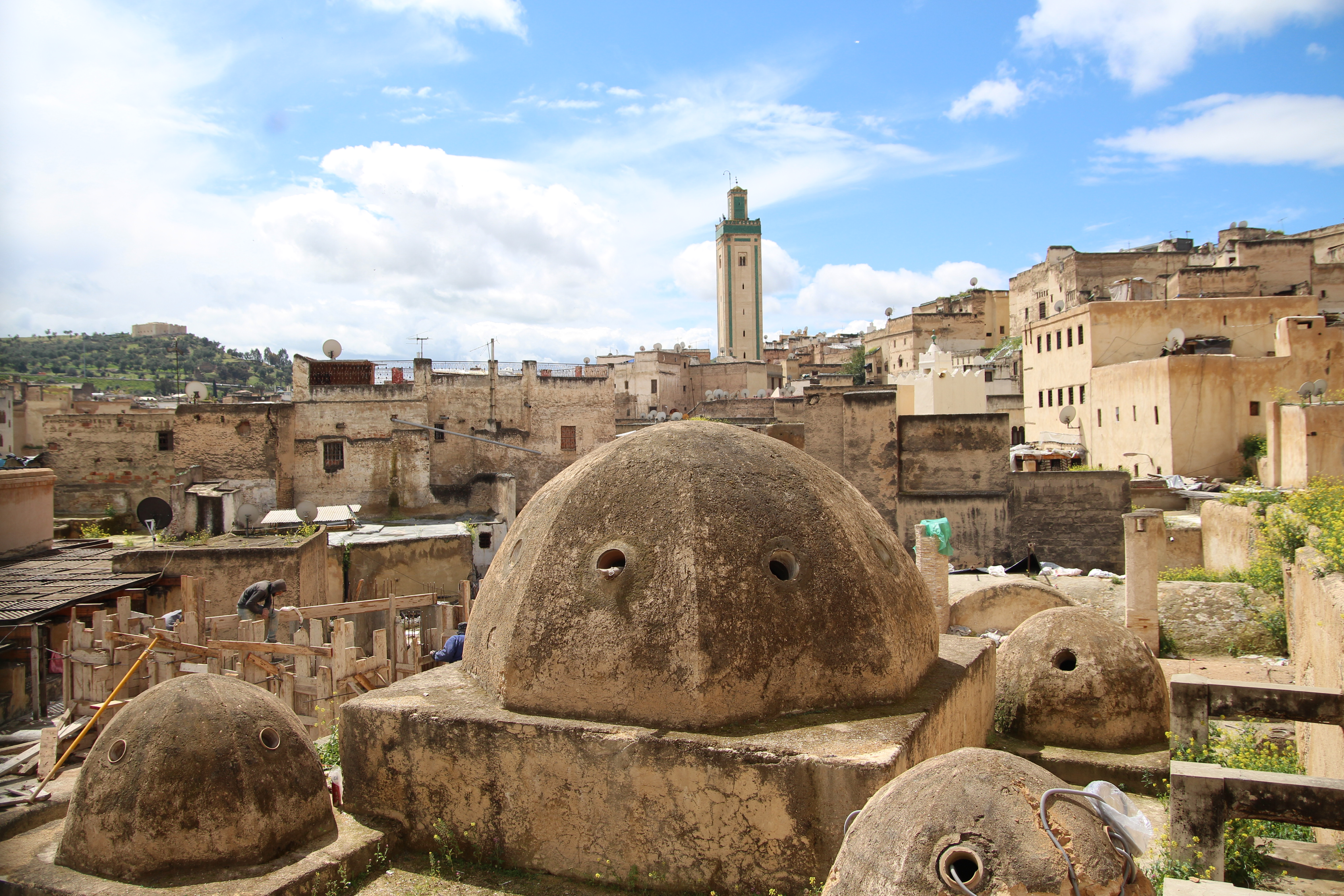
Rooftop view of the domes of the Saffarin Hammam, located at Place Seffarine

Fez is also notable for having preserved a great many of its historic hammams (public bathhouses in the Muslim world), thanks in part to their continued usage by locals up to the present day. Out of the total 5000 hammãms in Morocco, 120 of them are located within Fez. Notable examples, all dating from around the 14th century, include the Hammam as-Saffarin, the Hammam al-Mokhfiya, and the Hammam Ben Abbad.

They were generally built next to a well or natural spring which provided water, while the sloping topography of the city allowed for easy drainage. The layout of the traditional hammam in the region was inherited from the Roman bathhouse model. The first major room visitors entered was the undressing room (mashlah in Arabic or goulsa in the local Moroccan Arabic dialect), equivalent to the Roman apodyterium. From the undressing room visitors proceeded to the bathing/washing area which consisted of three rooms: the cold room (el-barrani in the local Arabic dialect; equivalent to the frigidarium), the middle room or warm room (el-wasti in Arabic; equivalent to the tepidarium), and the hot room (ad-dakhli in Arabic; equivalent to the caldarium). Though their architecture can be very functional, some of them, like the Hammam as-Saffarin and the Hammam al-Mokhfiya, have notable decoration. Although they are architecturally not very prominent from the exterior, they are recognizable from the rooftops by their pierced domes and vaults which usually covered the main chambers. Walls are coated with Tadlakt to smoothen their surfaces and to resist the high humidity. The warm and hot rooms were heated using a traditional hypocaust system just as Roman bathhouses did, with furnaces usually located behind the hot room. Fuel was provided by wood but also by recycling the waste by-products of other industries in the city such as wood shavings from carpenters' workshops and olive pits from the nearby olive presses. This traditional system continued to be used even up to the 21st century.

=== Street fountains (saqayyas) ===
Fes is also known for numerous fountains which offered free water. Fountains were often included in palaces for the pleasure of its residents, in mosques and madrasas for the purpose of ablutions, or even as part of specially dedicated ablutions facilities attached to religious buildings. Many fountains, however, are also built along the sides of streets or on the exterior of buildings. According to historical authors, at the beginning of the 13th century there were around 80 fountains of this type in Fes. These wall fountains of Fes generally share similar characteristics and decoration. Their original construction was often an act of charity sponsored by patrons with means, which is sometimes recorded by a surviving inscription. They are often decorated with zellij tiling, carved stucco, and a canopy of carved wood or even of muqarnas.

Probably the most famous of these is the Nejjarine Fountain (Saqqayat an-Najjarin) located in front of the Funduq al-Najjarin (the present-day Nejjarine Museum). It was commissioned in the 19th century by the Sultan Abd al-Rahman (ruled 1822–1859). It is richly decorated with a surface of zellij tiling framed by an arch of carved stucco, overshadowed by a canopy of carved wood surmounted by a short roof green tiles. Along its base, below the taps, is a rectangular basin.

A much older example is the Fountain of Sidi Frej, located near the Maristan of Sidi Frej and the Henna Souk. It is the oldest reliably dated fountain in the city. Like the Nejjarine Fountain, it has a back wall covered in zellij tiles (although in a simpler motif) framed by a pointed horseshoe arch inside another simple rectangular frame (an alfiz). Inside the arch, set amidst the zellij tiles, are small panels of black and white marble carved with ornate arch motifs. Below and in front of this decorative area is a water basin. Above the decorated area is a larger surface, nearly plain except for a small blind arch in the middle with a double-pointed lambrequin profile. Above this all is a wooden canopy, relatively simple in design, with an inscription repeating a particular blessing in Arabic. Most notably, inside the small lambrequin blind arch below this is a rectangular marble panel containing the original foundation inscription. The text describes the fountain's creation and praises its founder, Abd al-Haqq II (the last Marinid sultan). It also mentions that the fountain's construction was supervised by the sultan's vizier, Abu Zakariya Yahya ibn Ziyan al-Wattasi (who founded the subsequent Wattasid dynasty). Lastly, it indicates that construction was finished on Jumada I, 840 AH (November 11, 1436 CE). Another line added just above the original text states that the fountain was restored in 1090 AH (1679 CE). The fountain has thus been much restored, and Alfred Bel believed that it was probably once covered in carved stucco decoration which was then lost over time. The inscription and the small marble panel ornaments are from the original Marinid construction, while the wooden canopy above dates from the 17th century restoration. Today, some tiles along the top of the water basin visibly indicate, in both French and Arabic, a modern restoration in 1986.

Traditional fountains in Fez

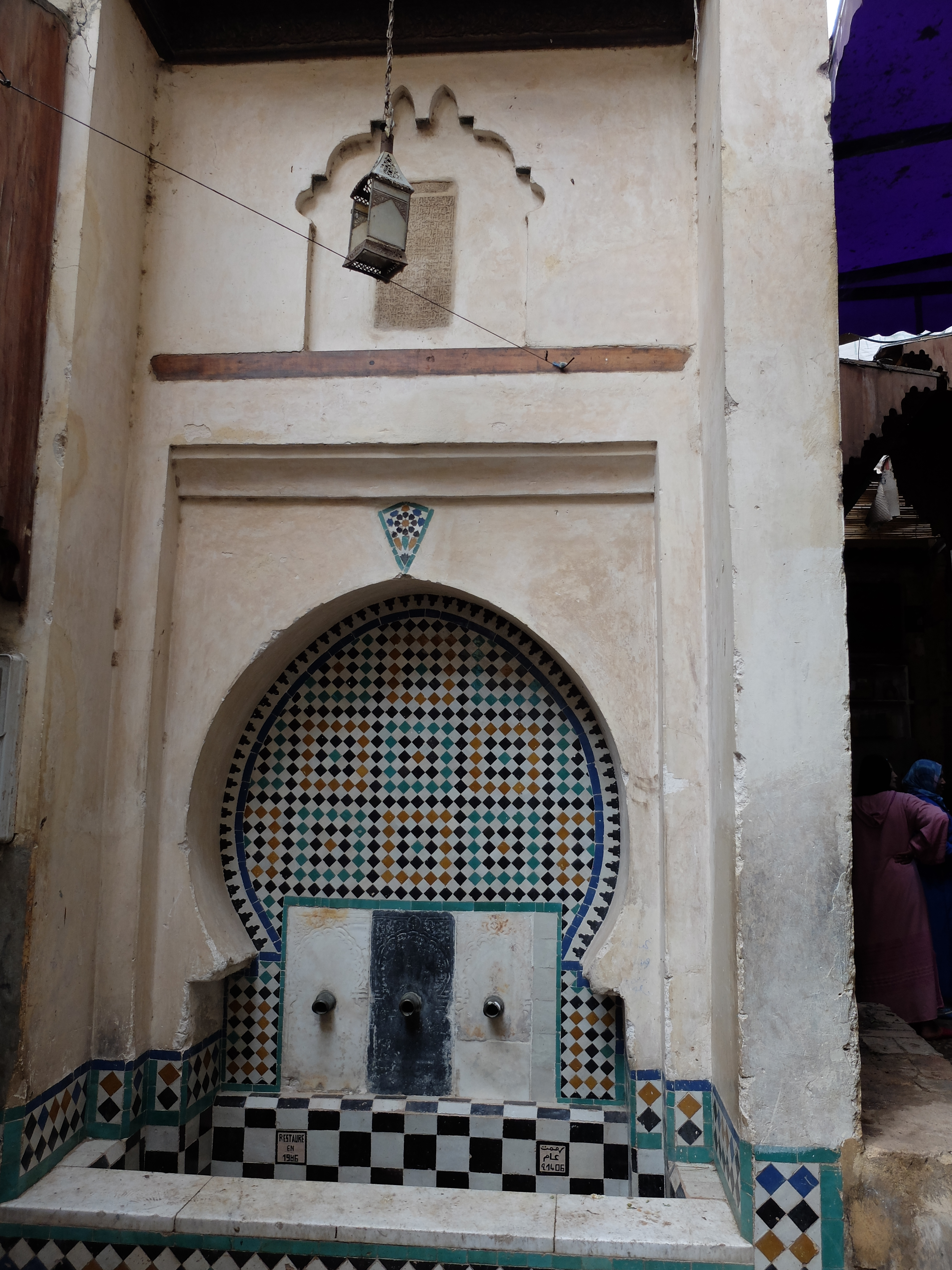
Fountain of Sidi Frej (built in 1426 with later restorations)

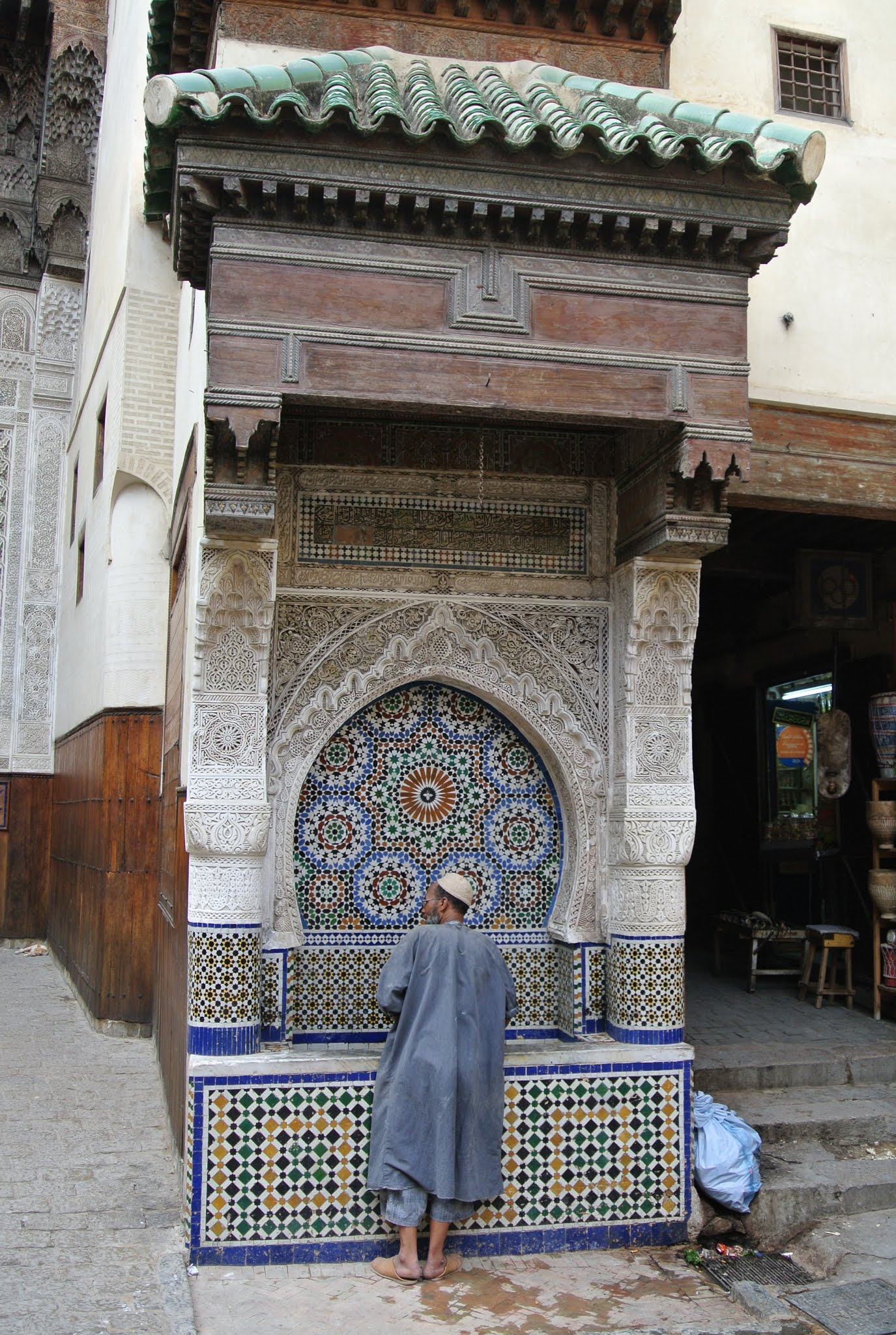
Nejjarine Fountain (19th century)

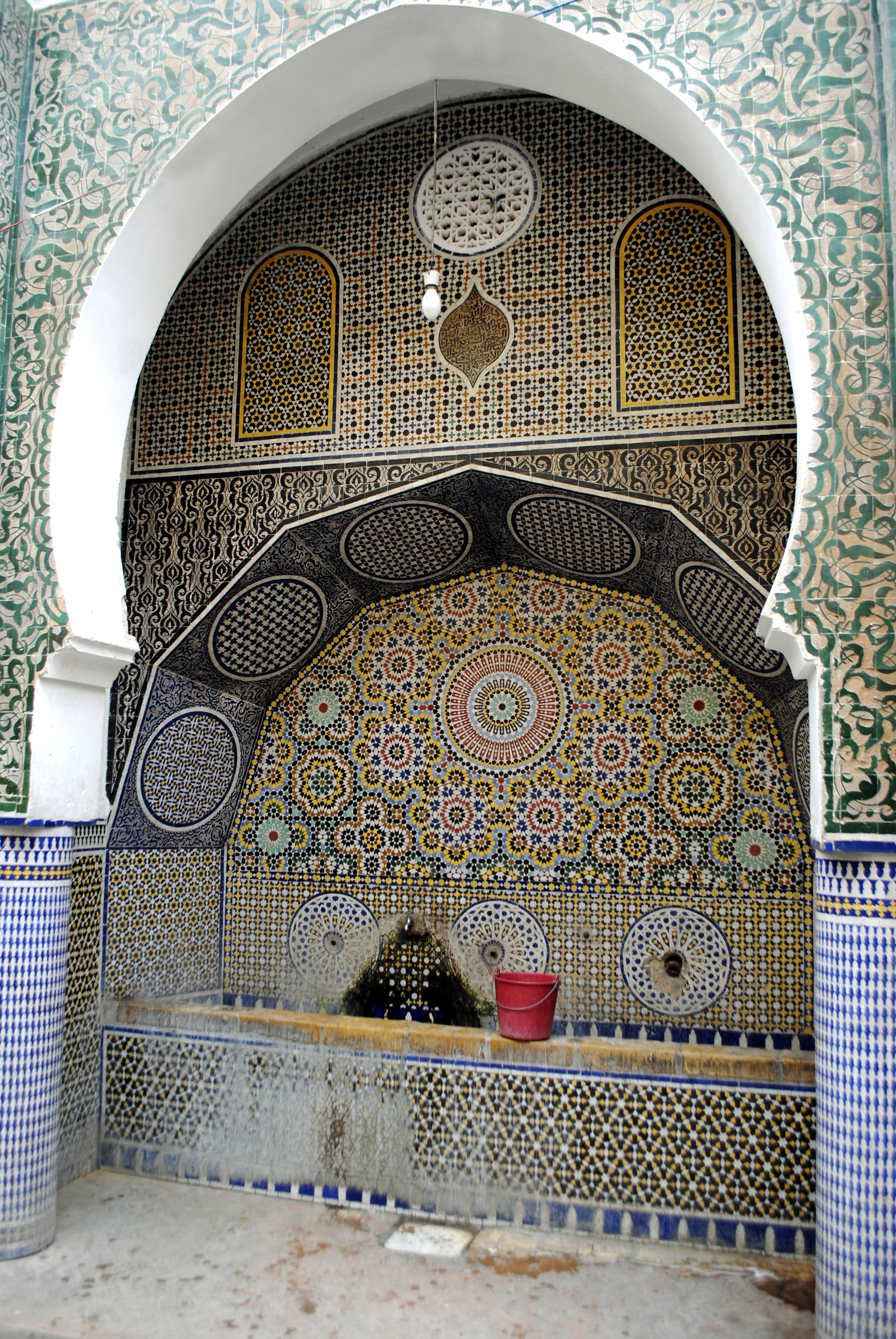
Another fountain on Tala'a Seghira (dated to 1923–24 according to its inscription)

=== Tanneries ===
Since the inception of the city, tanning industry has been continually operating in the same fashion as it did in the early centuries. Today, the tanning industry in the city is considered one of the main tourist attractions. There are three tanneries in the city, largest among them is Chouara Tannery near the Saffarin Madrasa along the river. The tanneries are packed with the round stone wells filled with dye or white liquids for softening the hides. The leather goods produced in the tanneries are exported around the world. The two other major tanneries are the Sidi Moussa Tannery to the west of the Zawiya of Moulay Idris II and the Ain Azliten Tannery in the neighbourhood of the same name on the northern edge of Fes el-Bali.

Tanneries in Fez

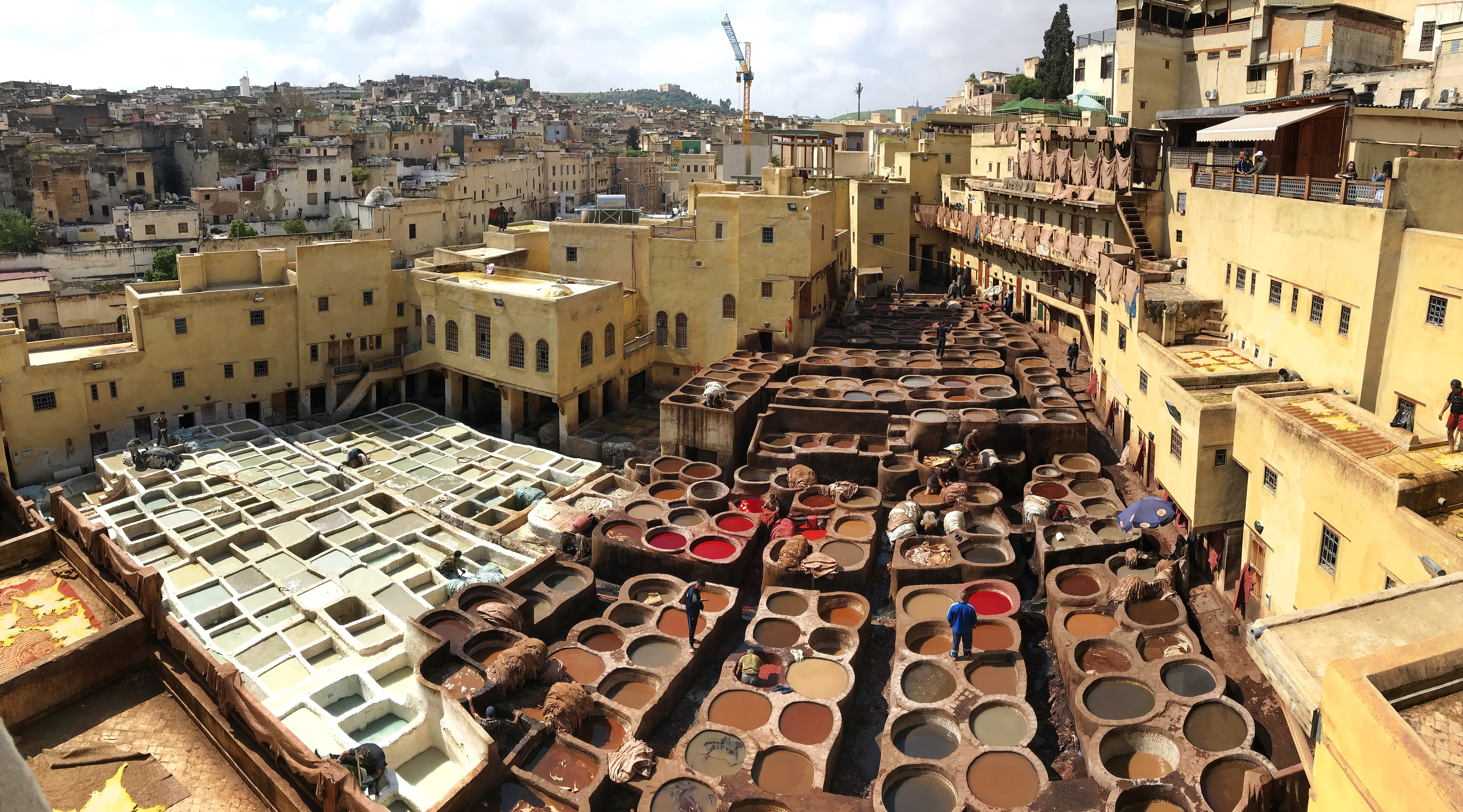
Chouara Tannery

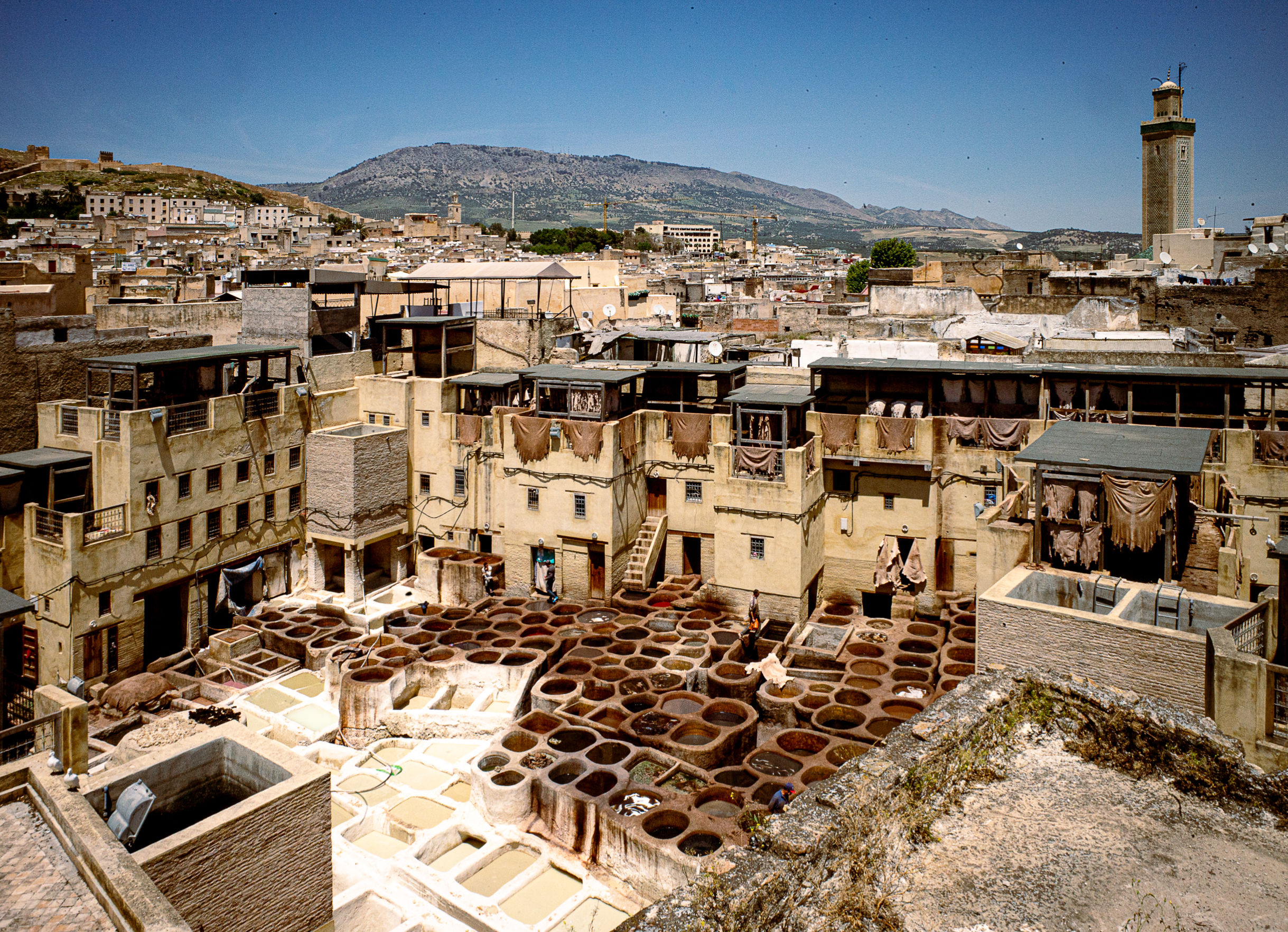
Sidi Moussa Tannery

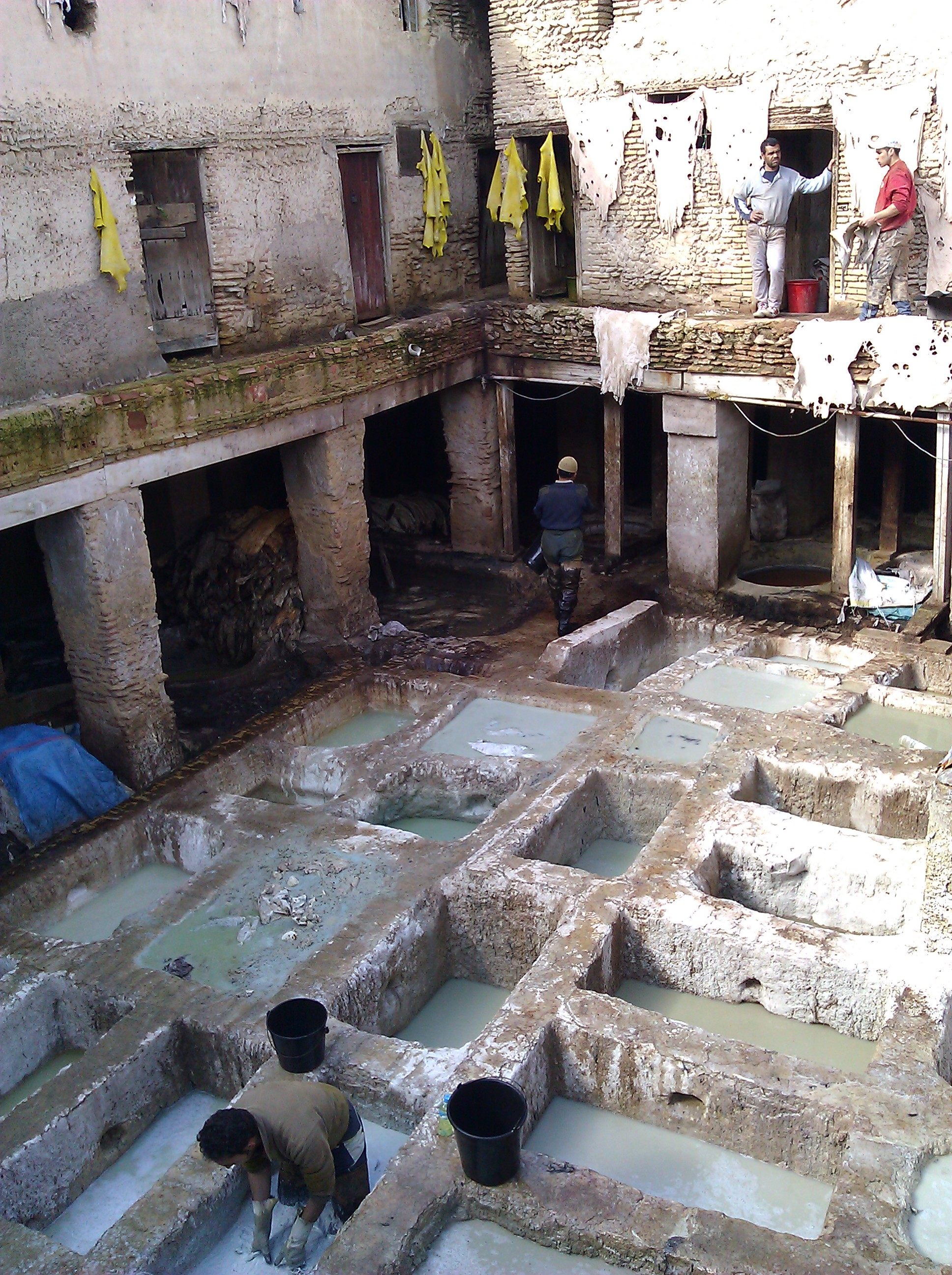
Ain Azliten Tannery

=== Historic houses and riads ===
Many old private residences have also survived to this day, in various states of conservation. One type of house known, centered around an internal courtyard, is known as a riad. The term riad originates from the Arabic term for garden, Arabic: رياض (riyad). Historically, the term referred to a common but specific type of interior garden: one that is symmetrically divided into four parts along its central axes and typically has a fountain at its middle. Today, a riad also refers to historic houses which have been converted into guesthouses for tourists and visitors. A typical riad in Fes has two or more storeys, whilst having an inward focus with a central courtyard. Generally, riads are open roof in order to allow air, sunlight to enter the courtyard, butt today some riads have a roof or cover over the courtyard or have pitched roof edges to prevent an excess of rain to enter. Riads also consist of very few windows on the exterior walls, in order to allow for privacy. The walls often consist of clay or mud brick, whilst are also adorned with tadelakt plaster and zellij tile work.

Some of the houses include the Dar al-Alami, the Dar Saada (now a restaurant), Dar 'Adiyil, Dar Belghazi, and others. Larger and richer mansions, such as the Dar Mnebhi, Dar Moqri, and Palais Jamaï (Jamai Palace), have also been preserved. Numerous palaces and riads are now utilized as hotels for the tourism industry. The Palais Jamai, for example, was converted into a luxury hotel in the early 20th century. The lavish former mansion of the Glaoui clan, known as the Dar Glaoui, is partly open to visitors but still privately owned.

Historic houses and mansions in Fez

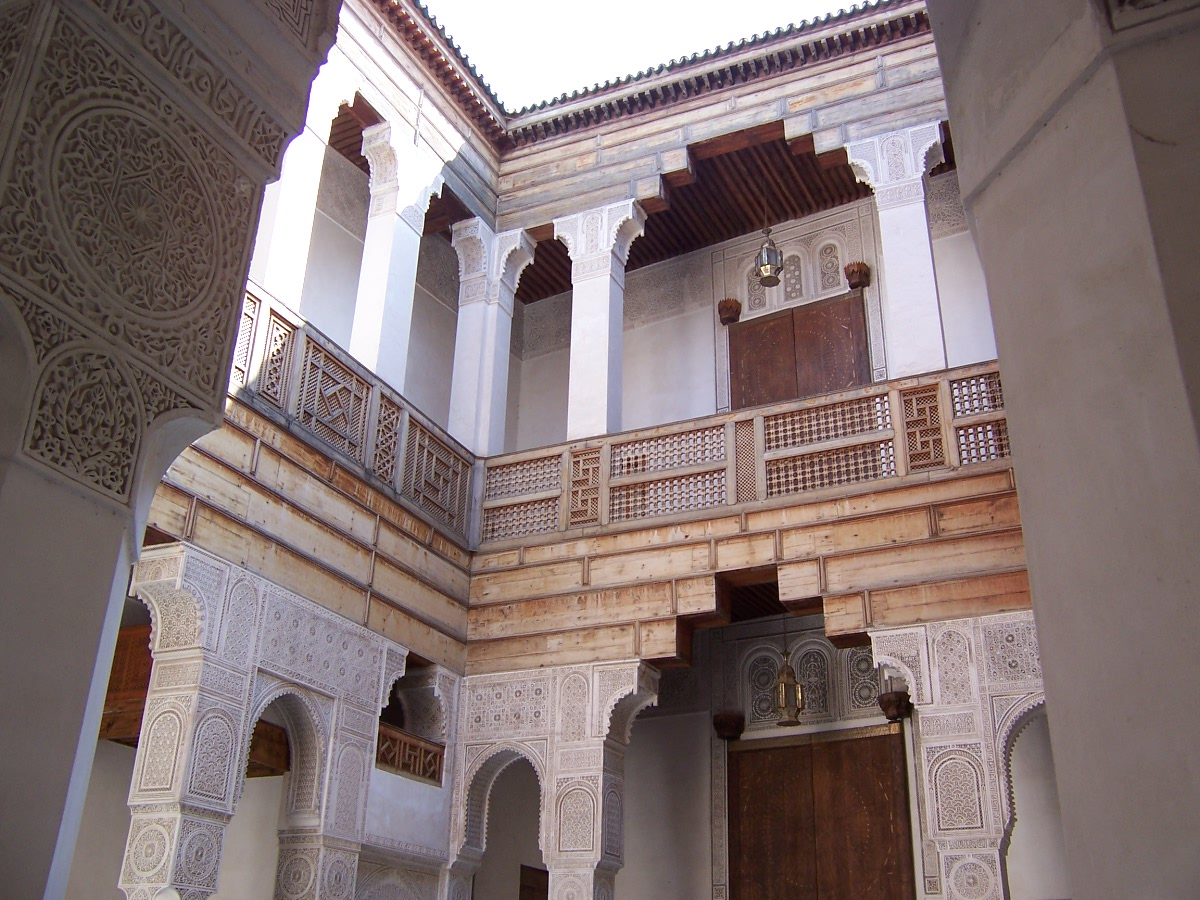
Dar Adiyel, an early 18th-century mansion

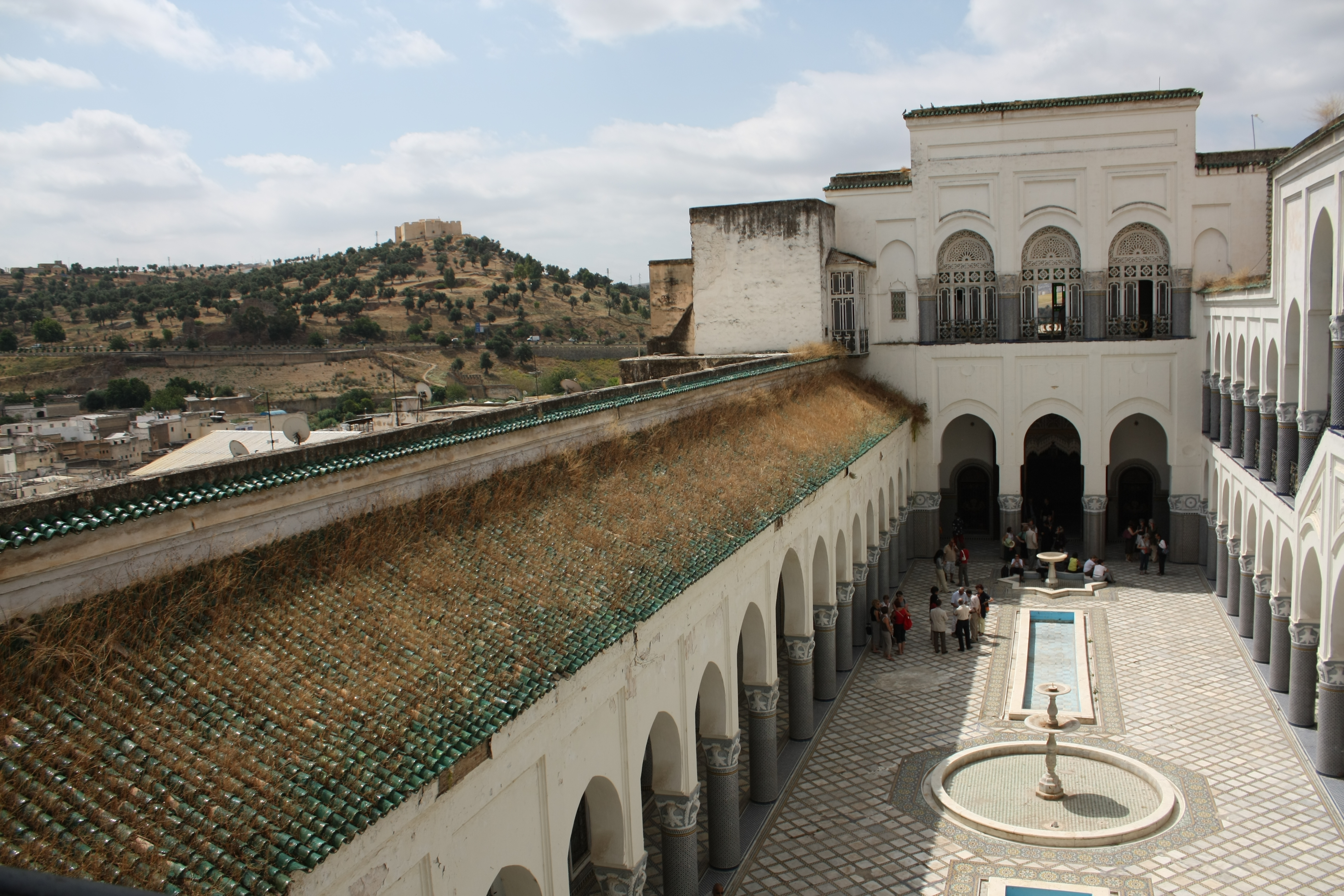
Dar Moqri, a late 19th- and early 20th-century palace

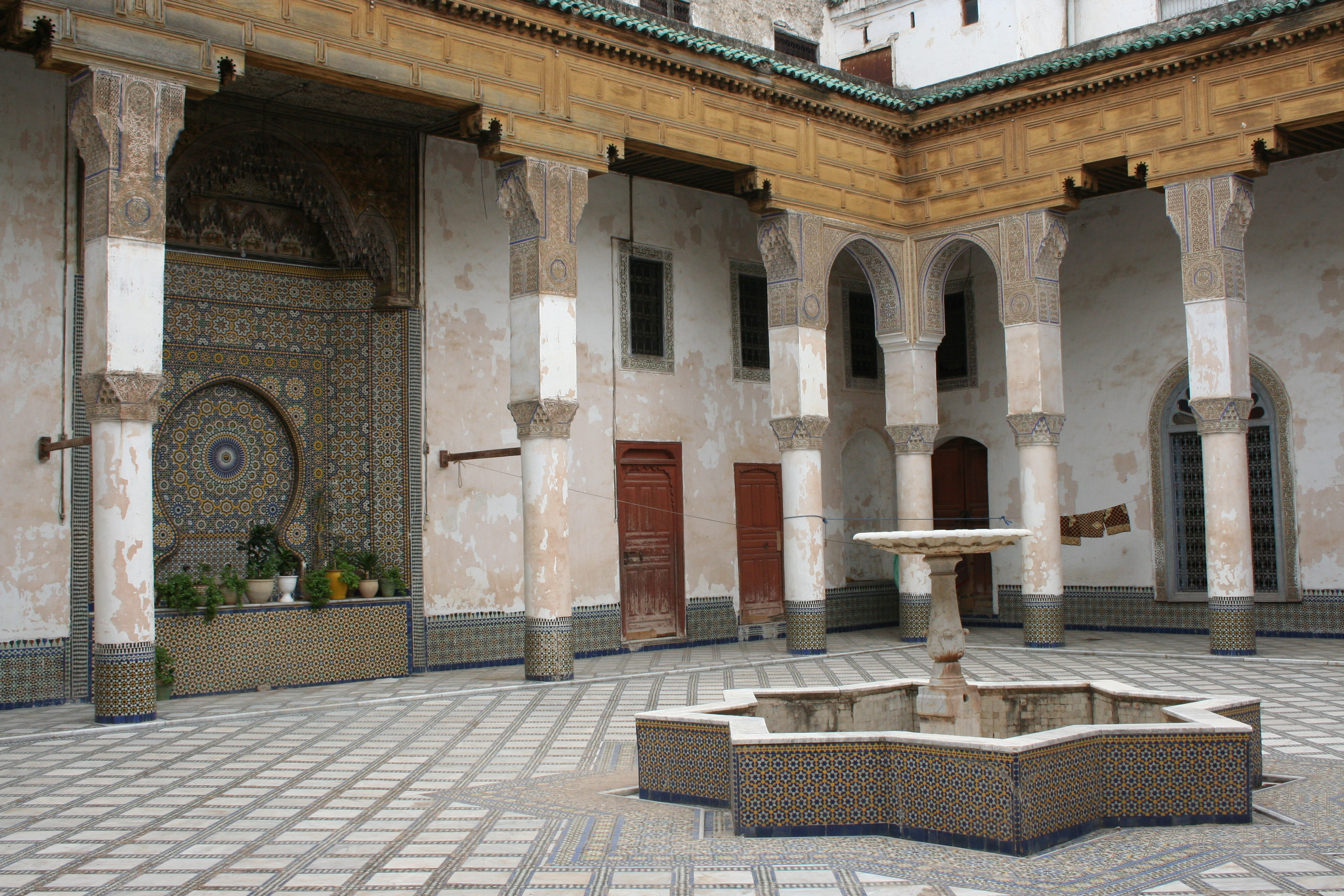
Dar Ba Mohammed Chergui (early 20th century)

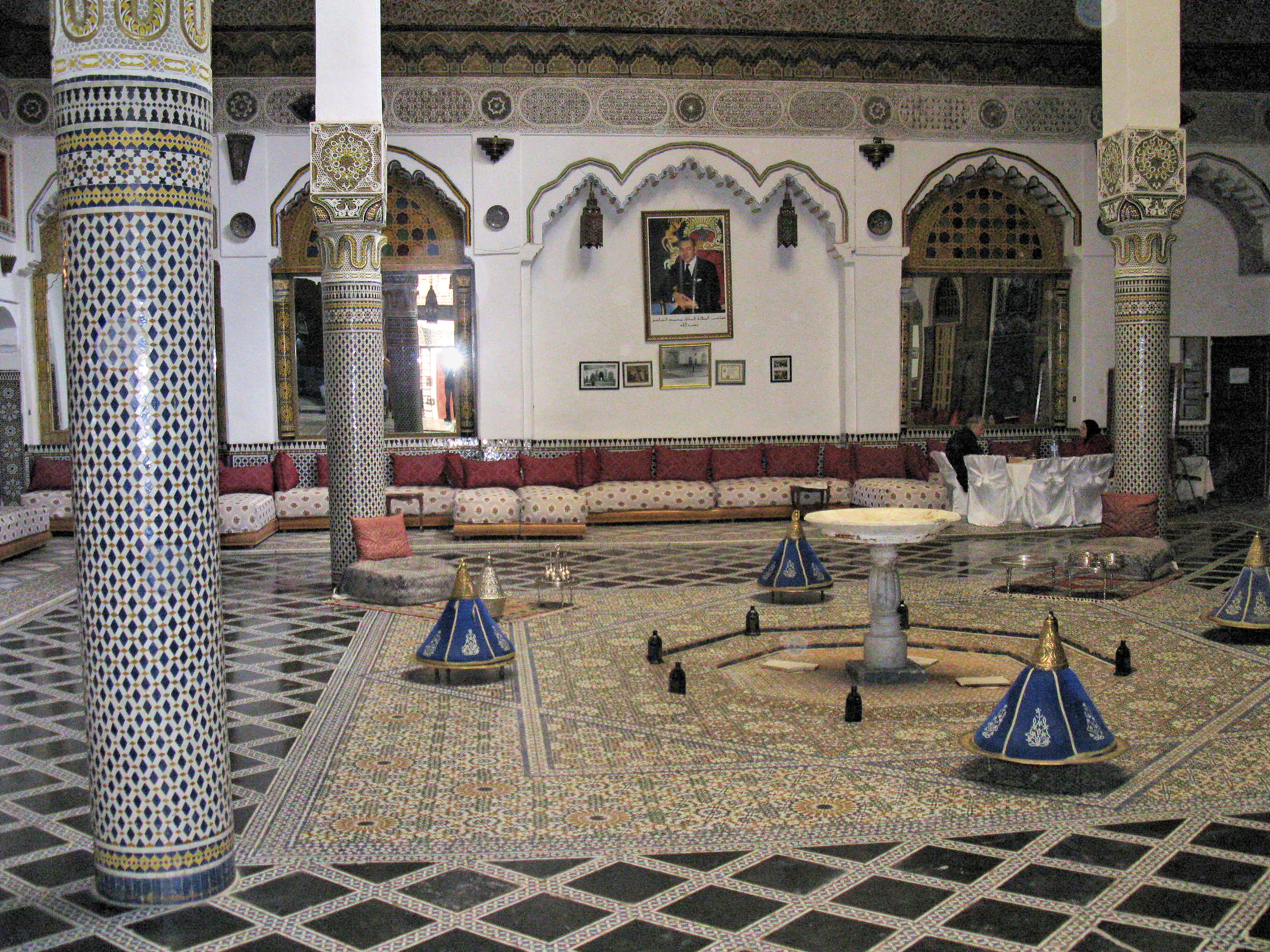
Dar Mnebhi (early 20th century)

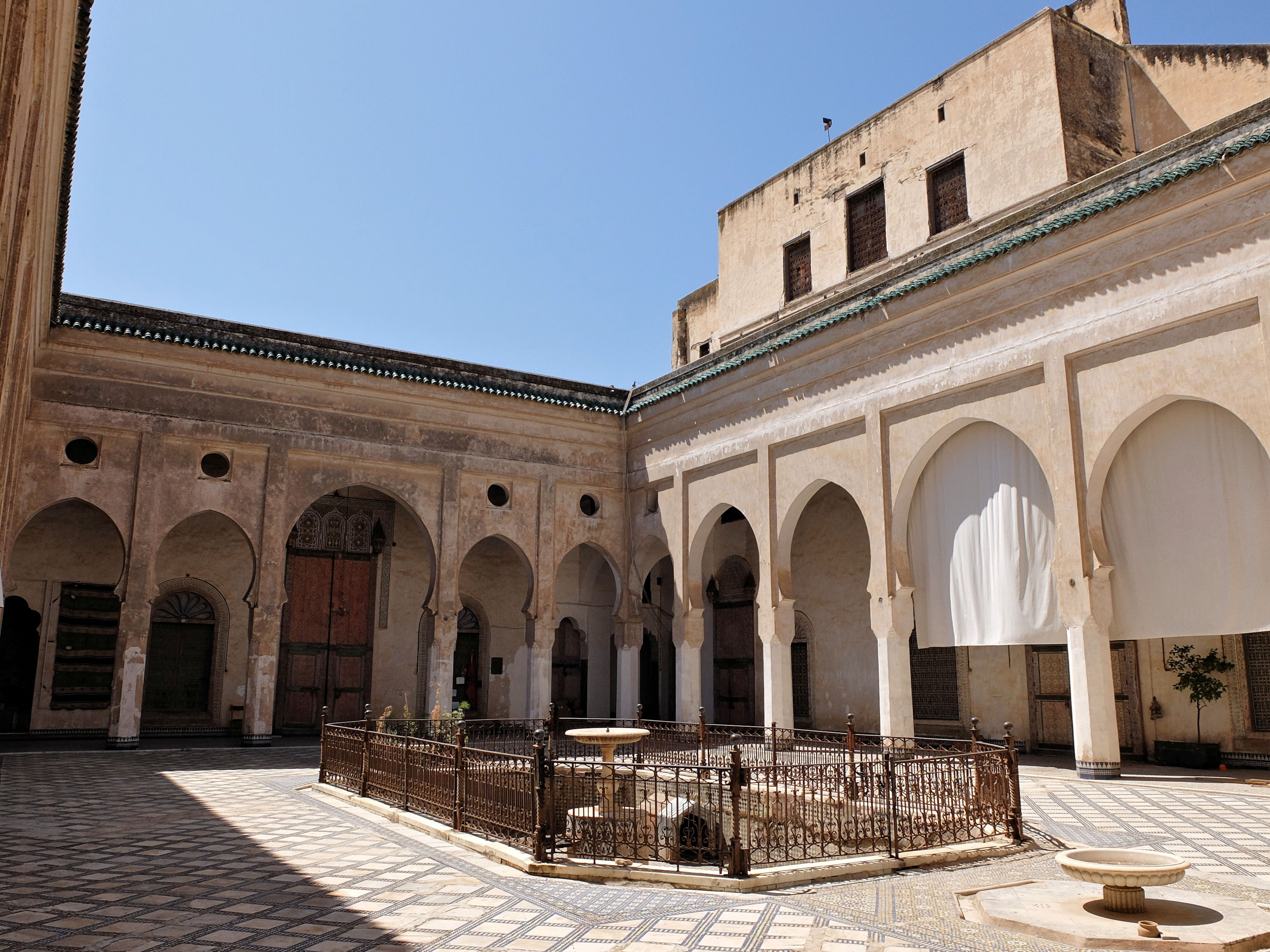
Courtyard of the Dar Glaoui

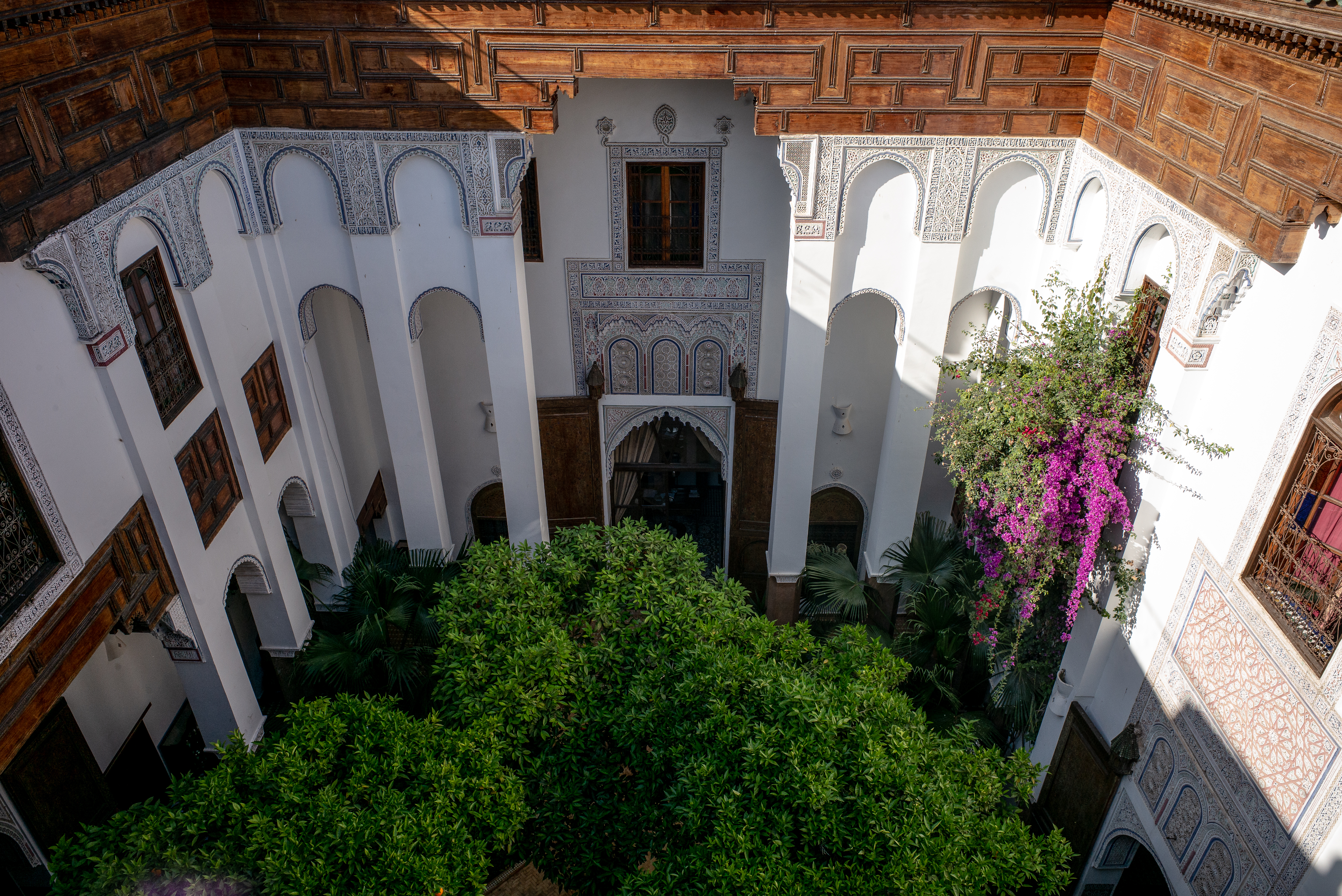
Example of a restored private riad in Fez

=== Royal Palaces ===
As a former capital, the city contains several royal palaces as well. A large area of Fes el-Jdid is taken up by the 80-hectare Royal Palace, or Dar al-Makhzen, whose new ornate gates (built in 1969–71) are renowned but whose grounds are not open to the public as they are still used by the King of Morocco when visiting the city. Dar Batha is a former palace completed by the Alawi sultan Moulay Abdelaziz (ruled 1894–1908) and turned into a museum in 1915 with around 6,000 pieces. The adjacent Dar el-Beida palace to the west was also part of the same complex, but remains a royal residence.

Royal palaces in Fez

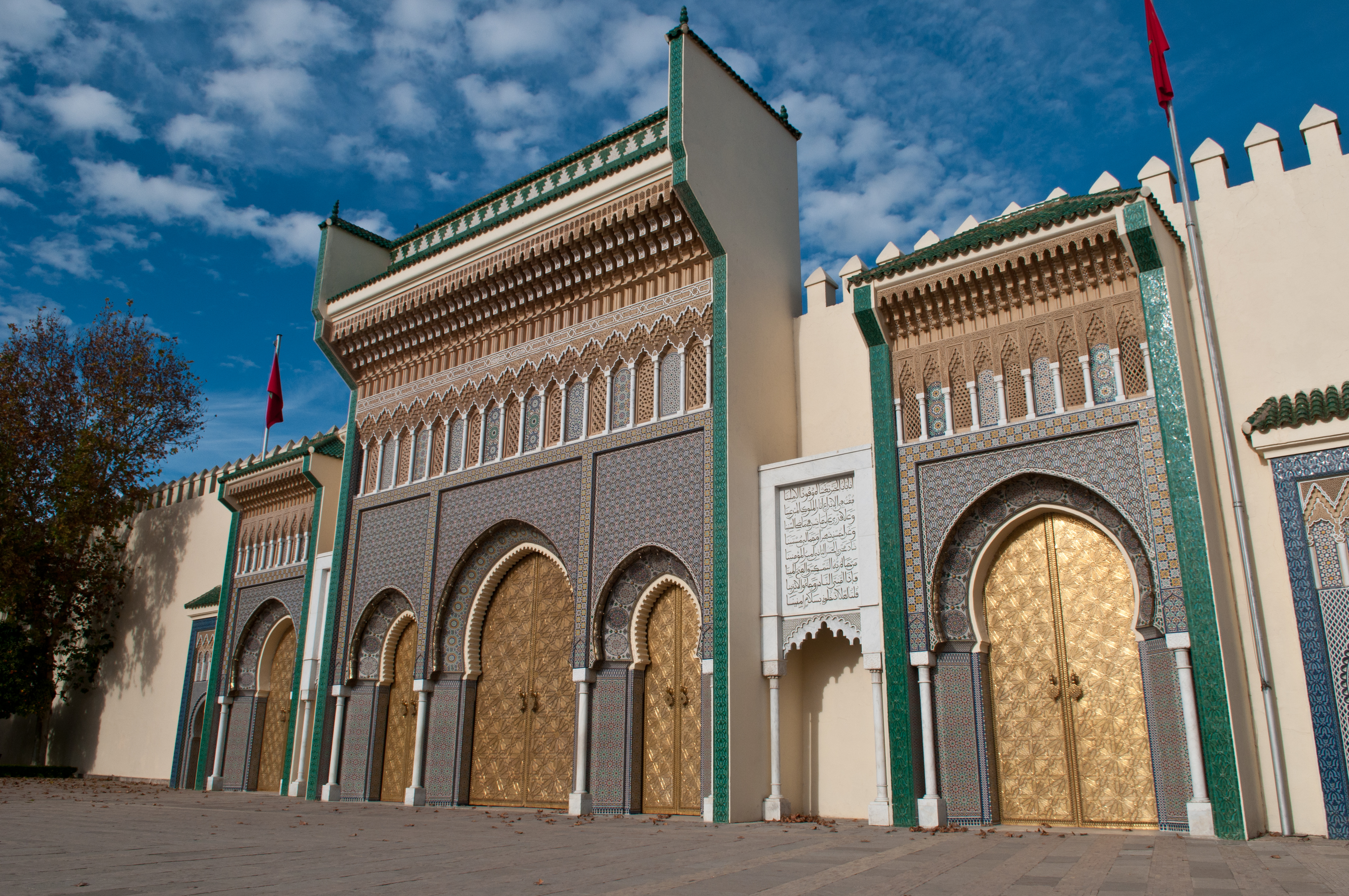
Gates of the Royal Palace of Fez (the gates were crafted in the 20th century but the palace has been established here since the late 13th century)

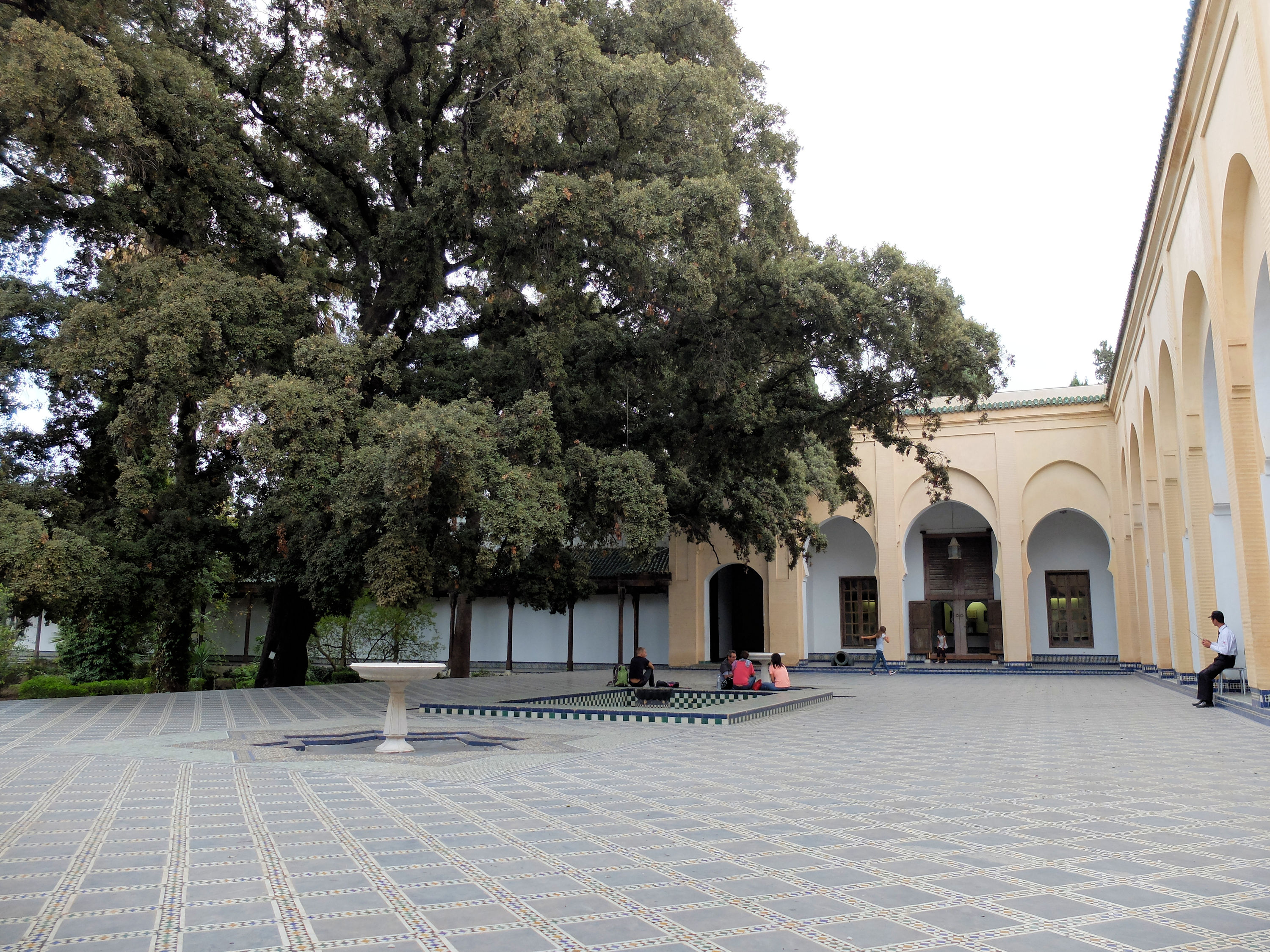
Dar Batha, a late 19th-century palace; now the Batha Museum

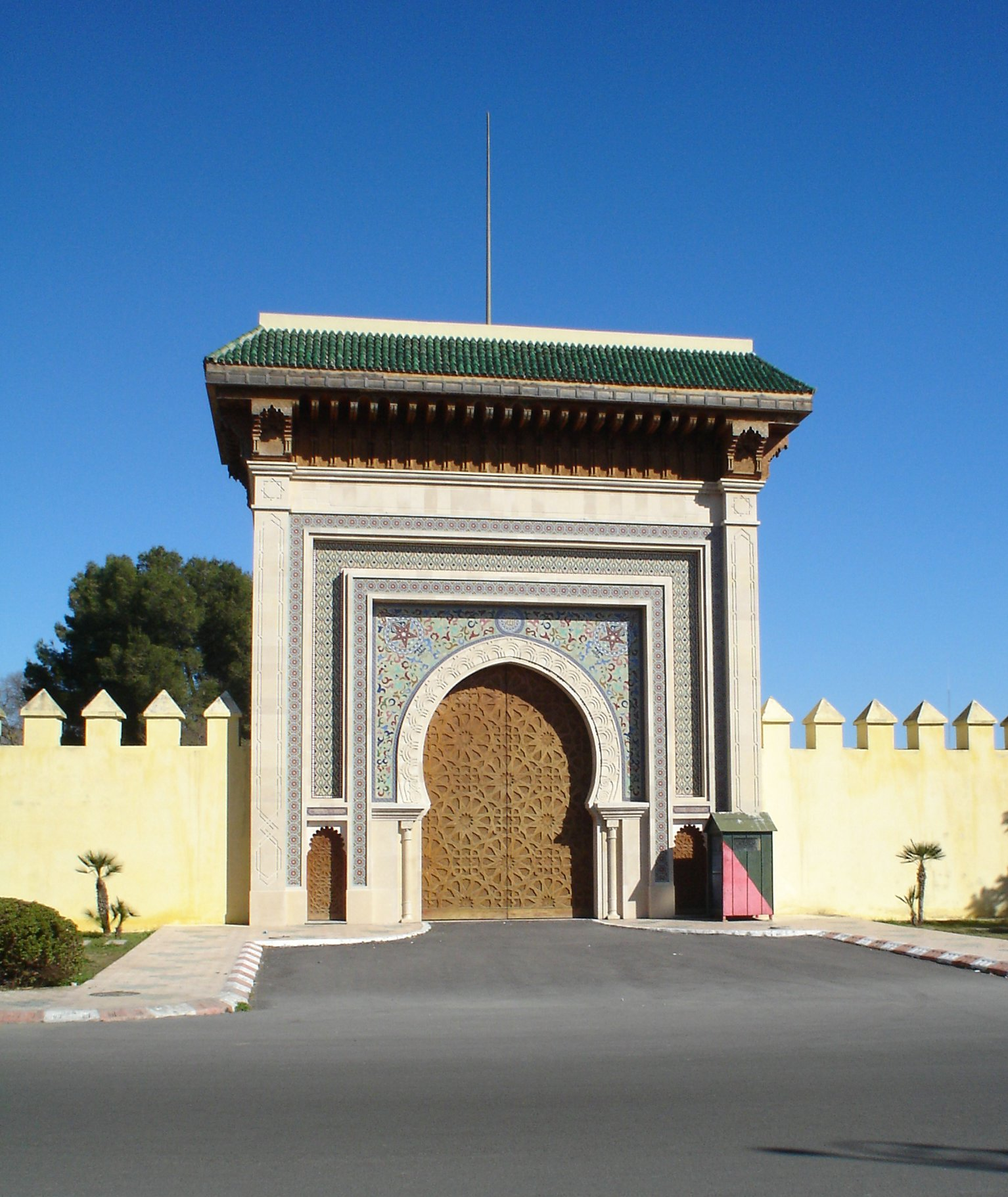
Present-day gate of the Dar el-Beida, a residence that was originally part of the same palace complex as Dar Batha

=== Gardens ===
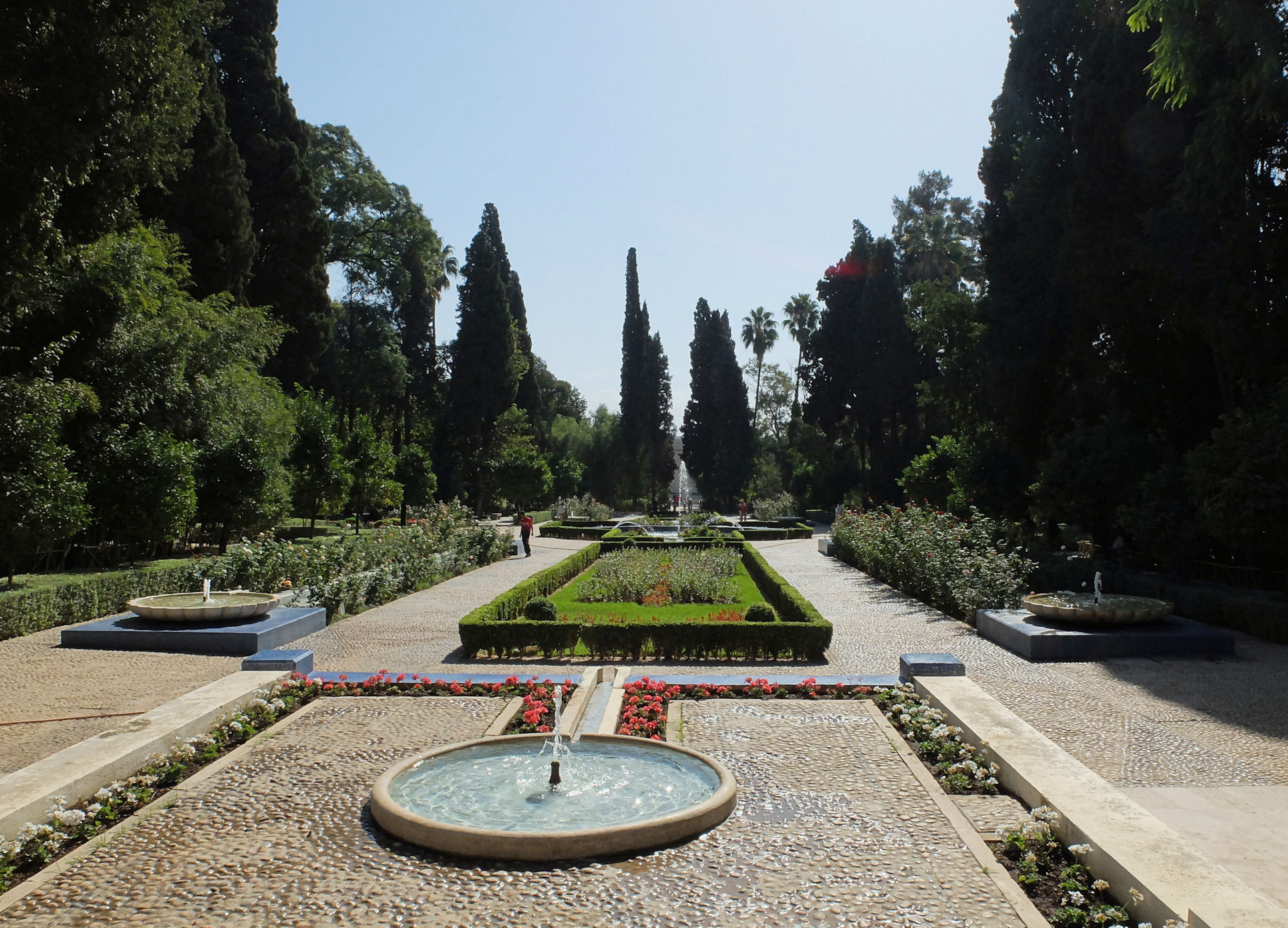
Jnan Sbil Gardens (created in the late 19th century)

The Jnane Sbil Gardens were created as a royal park and garden in the 19th century by Sultan Moulay Hassan I (ruled 1873–1894) between Fes el-Jdid and Fes el-Bali. Today it is the oldest garden of Fes. Many bourgeois and aristocratic mansions were also accompanied by private gardens, especially in the southwestern part of Fes el-Bali, an area once known as al-'Uyun. Other gardens also exist within the grounds of the historic royal palaces of the city, such as the Agdal and Lalla Mina Gardens in the Dar al-Makhzen or the gardens of the Dar el-Beida (originally attached to Dar Batha). In the late 13th century the Marinid sultans created the vast royal garden of al-Mosara, which covered a vast area north of Fes el-Jdid, but these disappeared in the centuries after the fall of the Marinids.

=== Fortifications ===
==== City walls ====
The entire medina of Fez was heavily fortified with crenelated walls with watchtowers and gates, a pattern of urban planning which can be seen in Salé and Chellah as well. City walls were placed into the current positions during the 11th century, under the Almoravid rule. During this period, the two formerly divided cities known as Madinat Fas and al-'Aliya were united under a single enclosure. The Almoravid fortifications were later destroyed and then rebuilt by the Almohad dynasty in the 12th century, under Caliph Muhammad al-Nasir. The oldest sections of the walls today thus date back to this time. These fortifications were restored and maintained by the Marinid dynasty from the 12th to 16th centuries, along with the founding of the royal citadel-city of Fes el-Jdid. Construction of the new city's gates and towers sometimes employed the labour of Christian prisoners of war.

City walls of Fez

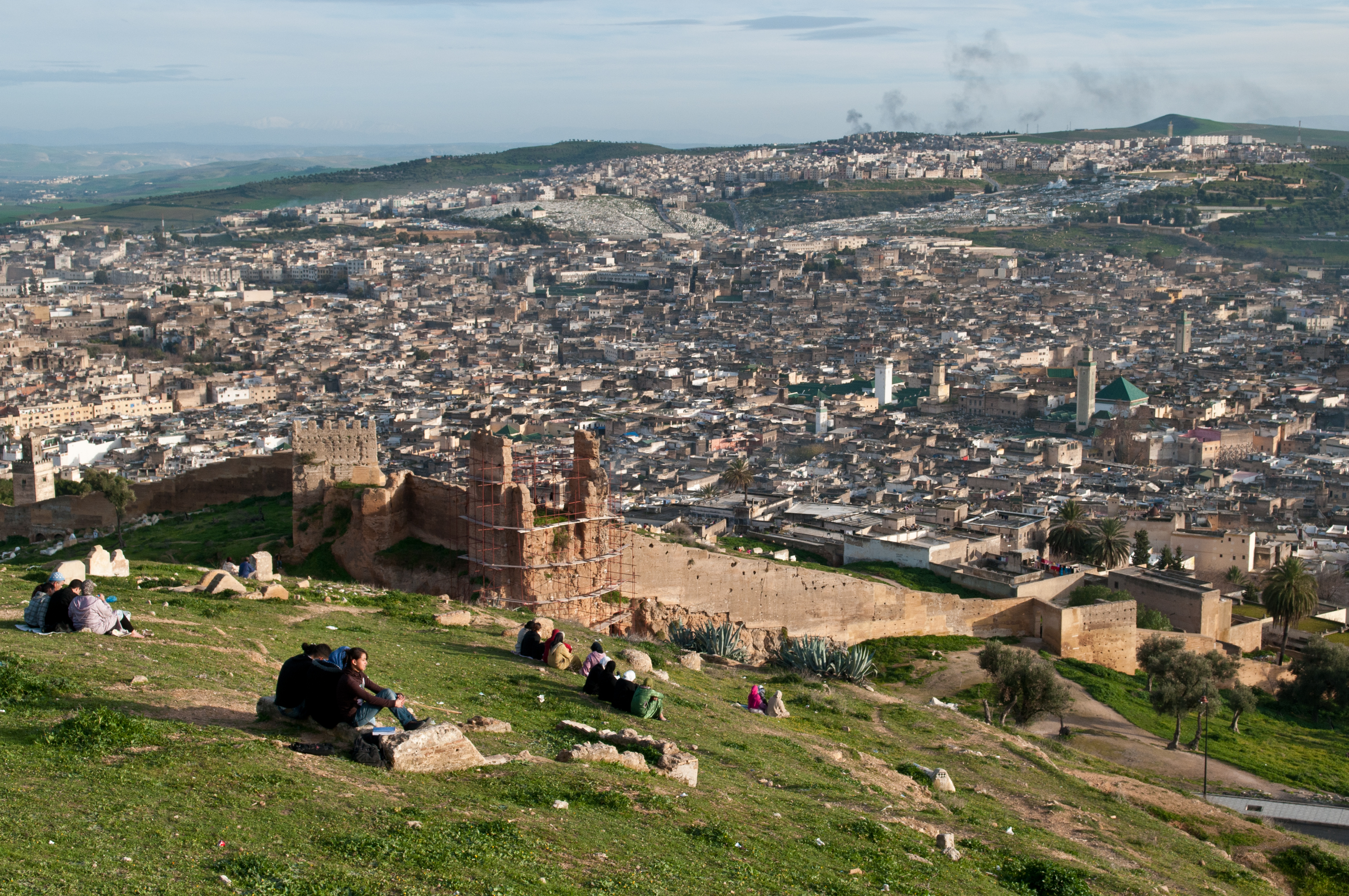
View of unrestored city walls on the north side of the Fes el-Bali, likely dating from Almohad period (early 13th century)

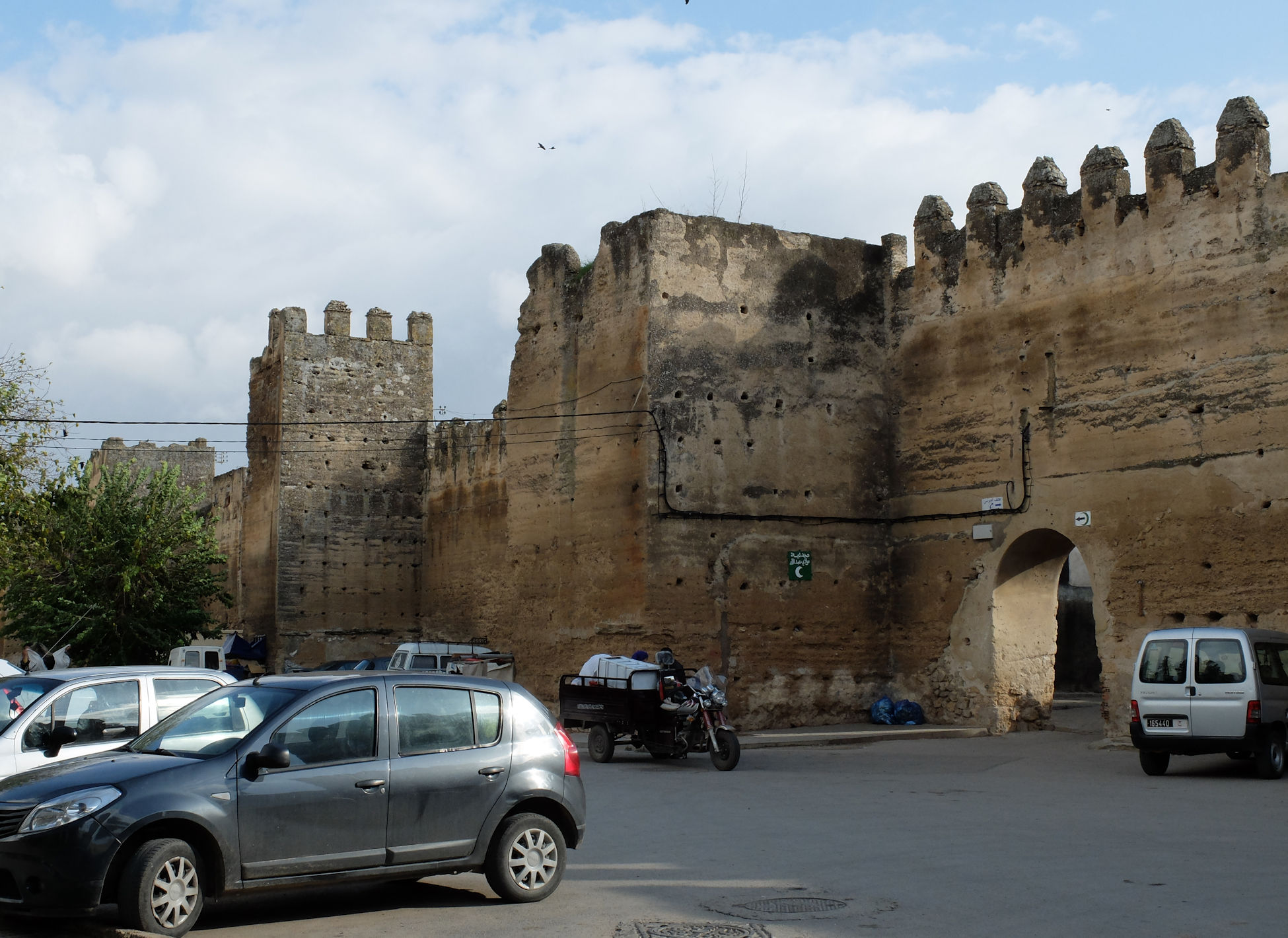
Section of unrestored city walls on the north side of Fes Jdid, dating from the Marinid period (late 13th century)

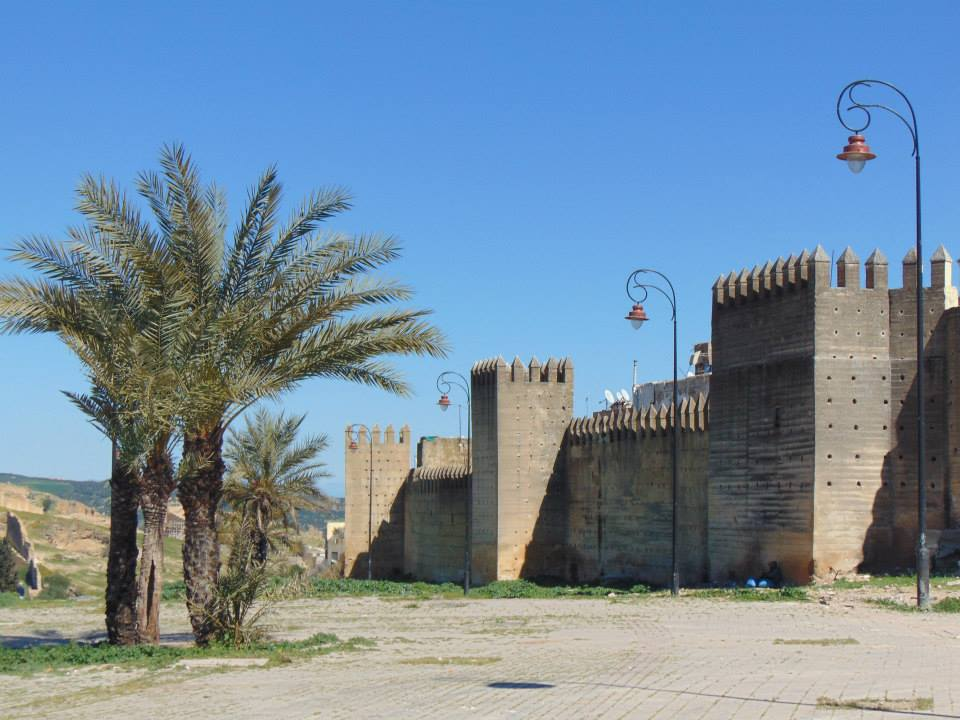
Section of restored city walls near Bab Mahrouk

==== City gates ====
The gates of Fez, scattered along the circuit of walls, were guarded by the military detachments and shut at night. Some of the main gates have existed, in different forms, since the earliest years of the city. The oldest gates today, and historically the most important ones of the city, are Bab Mahrouk (in the west), Bab Guissa (in the northeast), and Bab Ftouh (in the southeast). After the foundation of Fes Jdid by the Marinids in the 13th century, new walls and three new gates such as Bab Dekkakin, Bab Semmarine, and Bab al-Amer were established along its perimeter. Later, in modern times, the gates became more ceremonial rather than defensive structures, as reflected by the 1913 construction of the decorative Bab Bou Jeloud gate at the western entrance of Fes el-Bali by the French colonial administration.

Gates of Fez

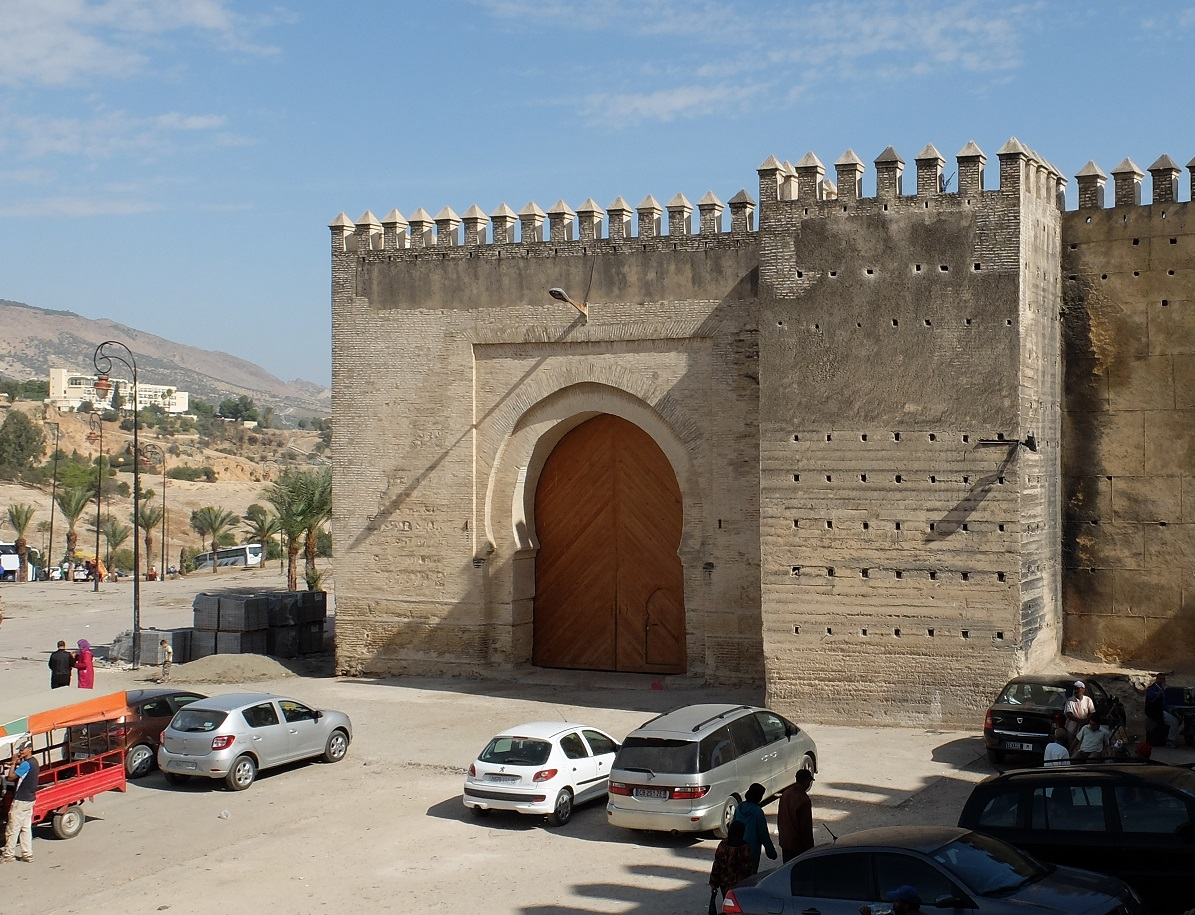
Bab Mahrouk

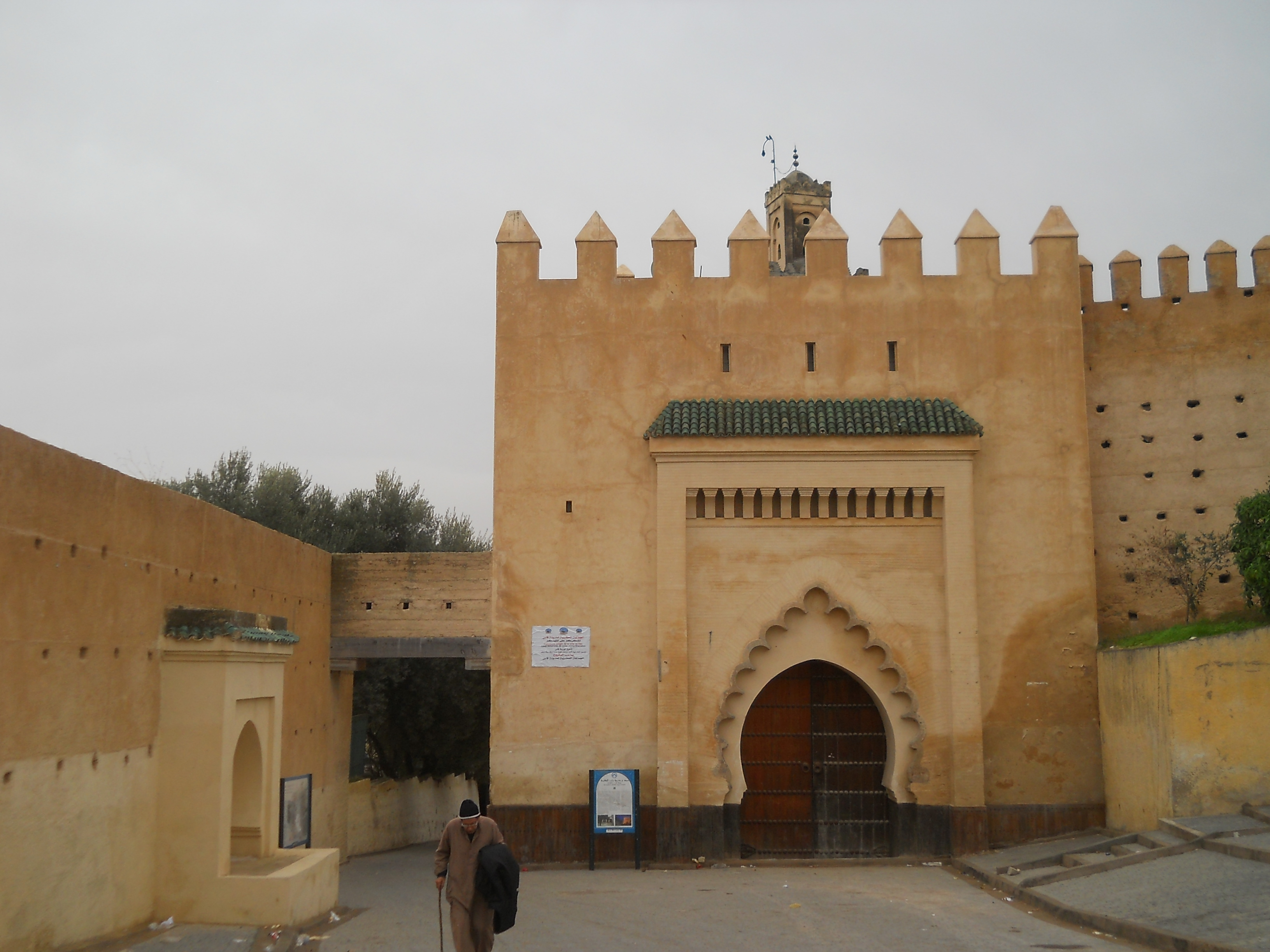
Bab Guissa

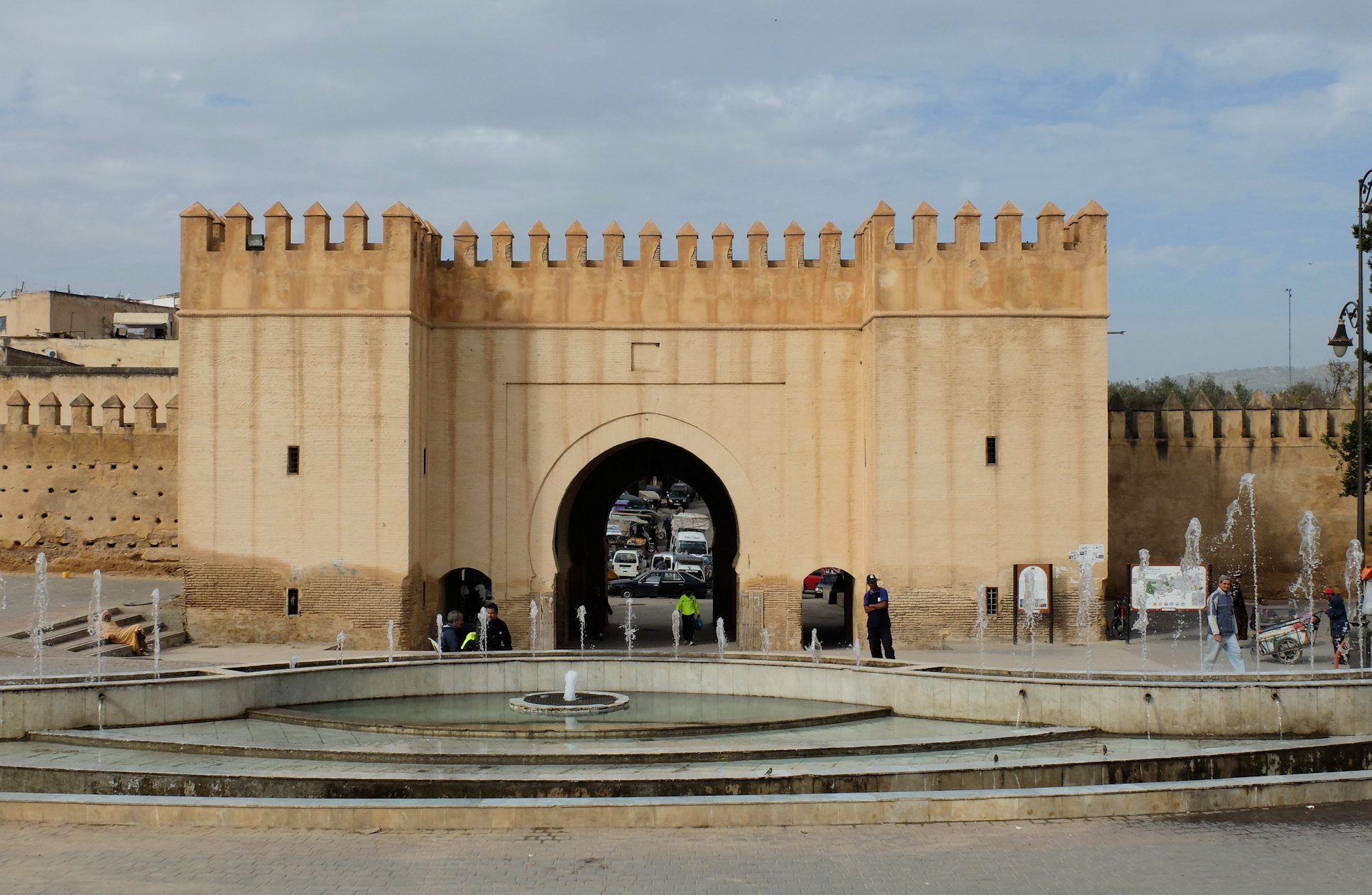
Bab Ftouh

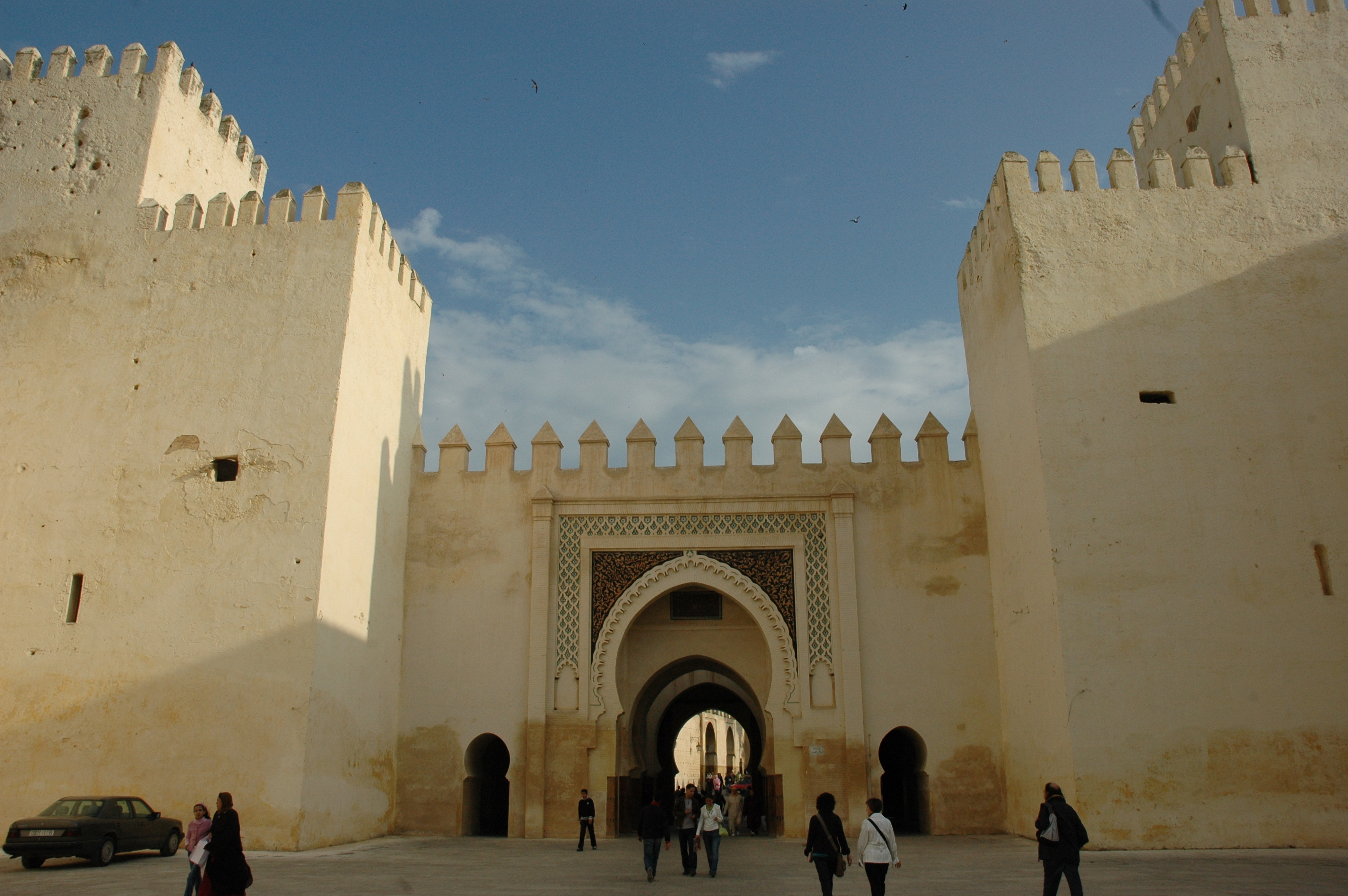
Bab Dekkakin (Bab es-Sebaa)

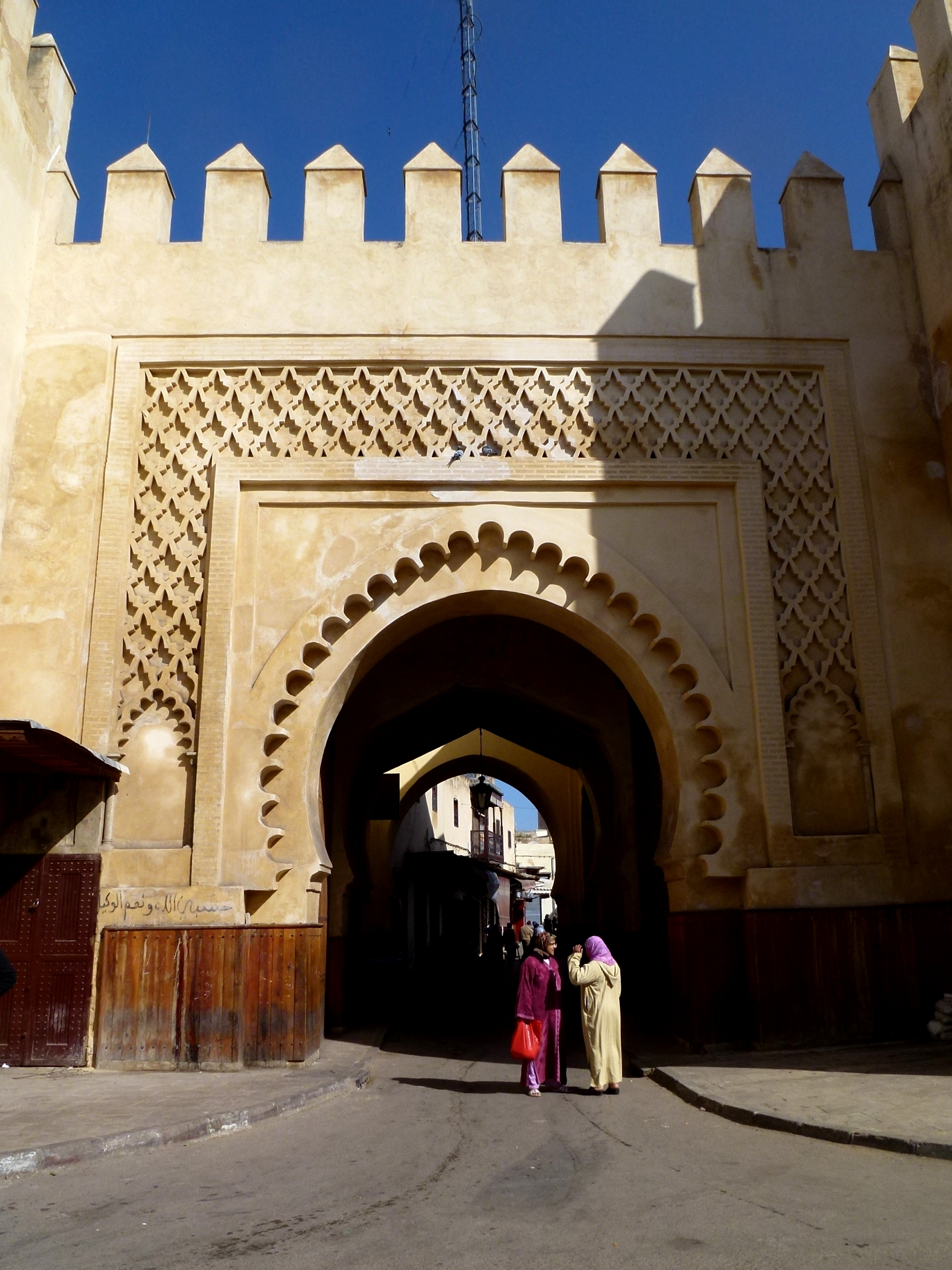
Bab Semmarine

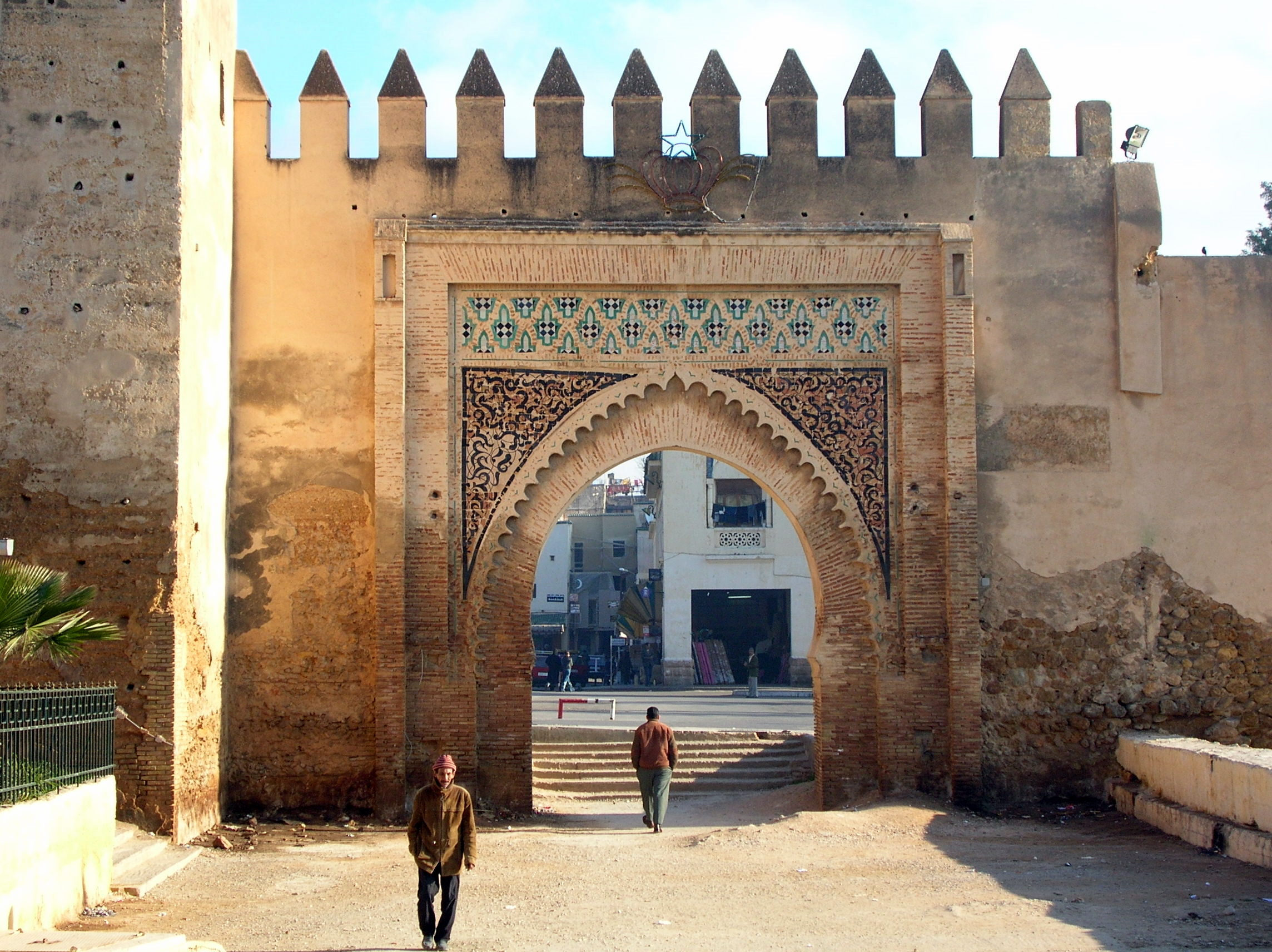
Bab al-Amer

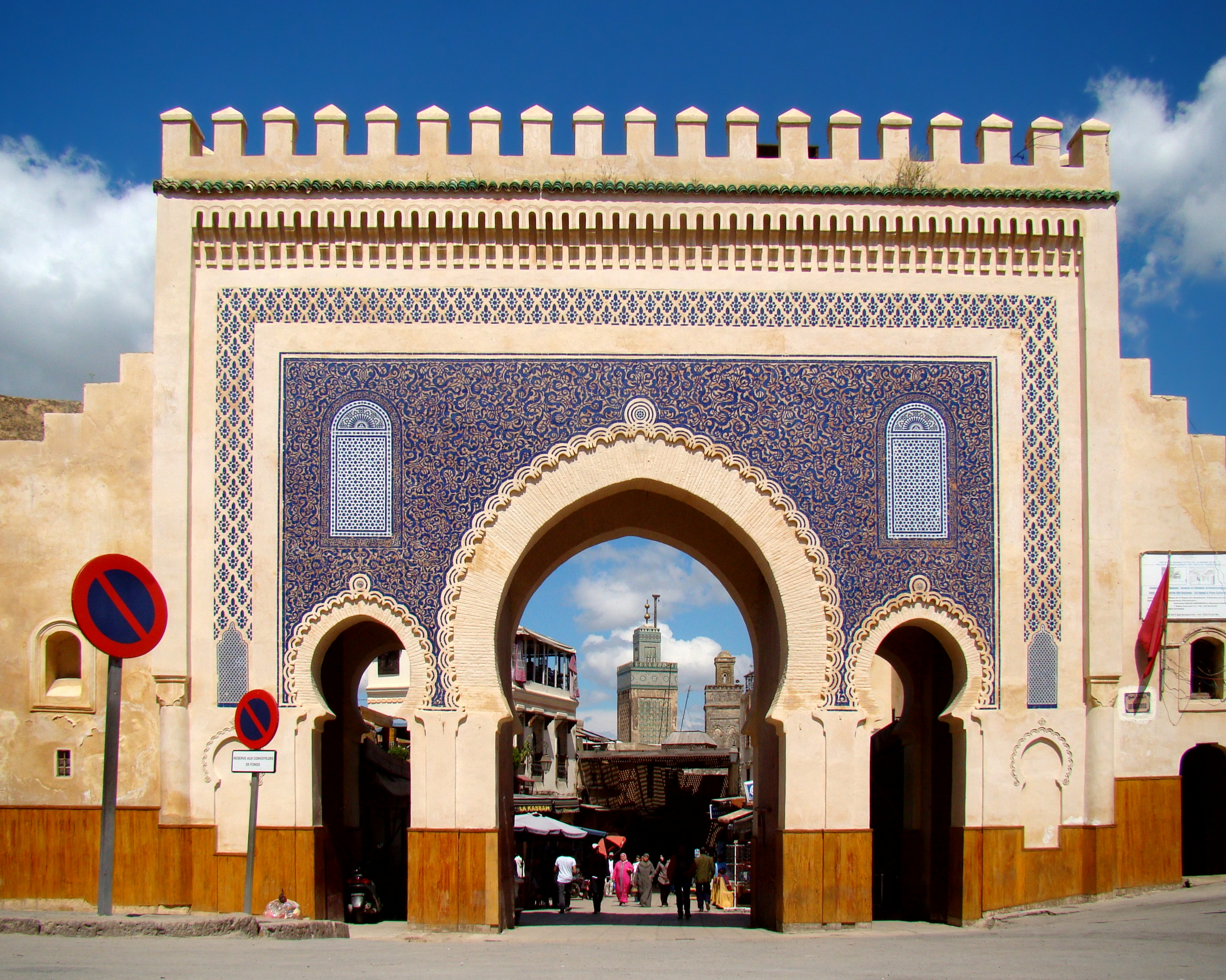
Bab Bou Jeloud

==== Forts and kasbahs ====
Along with the city walls and gates, several forts were constructed along the defensive perimeters of the medina during the different time periods. The city rapidly developed as the military garrison center of the region during the Almoravid era, in which the military operations were commanded and carried out to other North African regions and Southern Europe to the north, and Senegal river to the south. Subsequently, it led to the construction of numerous forts, kasbahs, and towers for both garrison and defense. A "kasbah" in the context of the Maghreb region is the traditional military structure for fortification, military preparation, command and control. Some of them were occupied as well by citizens, certain tribal groups, and merchants. Throughout the history, 13 kasbahs were constructed surrounding the old city. Among the most prominent among them is the Kasbah An-Nouar, located at the western or north-western tip of Fes el-Bali, which dates back to the Almohad era but was restored and repurposed under the Alawis. Today, it is an example of a kasbah serving as a residential district much like the rest of the medina, with its own neighborhood mosque. The Kasbah Bou Jeloud, which no longer exists as a kasbah today, was once the governor's residence and stood near Bab Bou Jeloud, south of the Kasbah an-Nouar. It too had its own mosque, known as the Bou Jeloud Mosque. Other kasbahs include the Kasbah Tamdert, built by the Saadis near Bab Ftouh, and the Kasbah Cherarda, built by the Alawis sultan Moulay al-Rashid just north of Fes Jdid. Kasbah Dar Debibagh is one of the newest kasbahs, built in 1729 during the Alawi era at 2 km from the city wall in a strategic position. The Saadis also built a number of strong bastions in the late 16th century to assert their control over Fes, including notably the Borj Nord which is among the largest strictly military structures in the city and now refurbished as a military museum. Its sister fort, Borj Sud, is located on the hills to the south of the city.

Kasbahs and forts in Fez

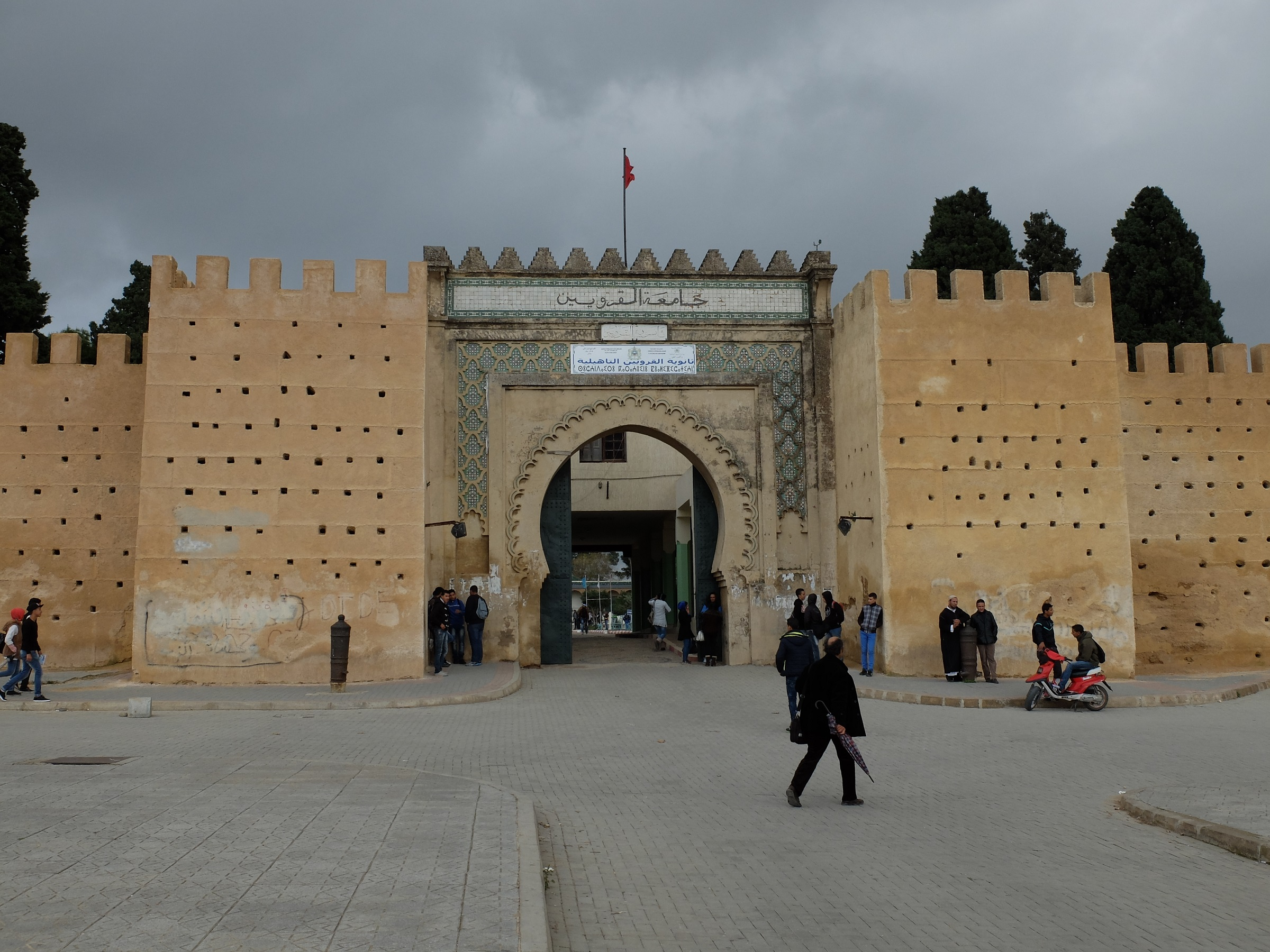
Kasbah Cherarda

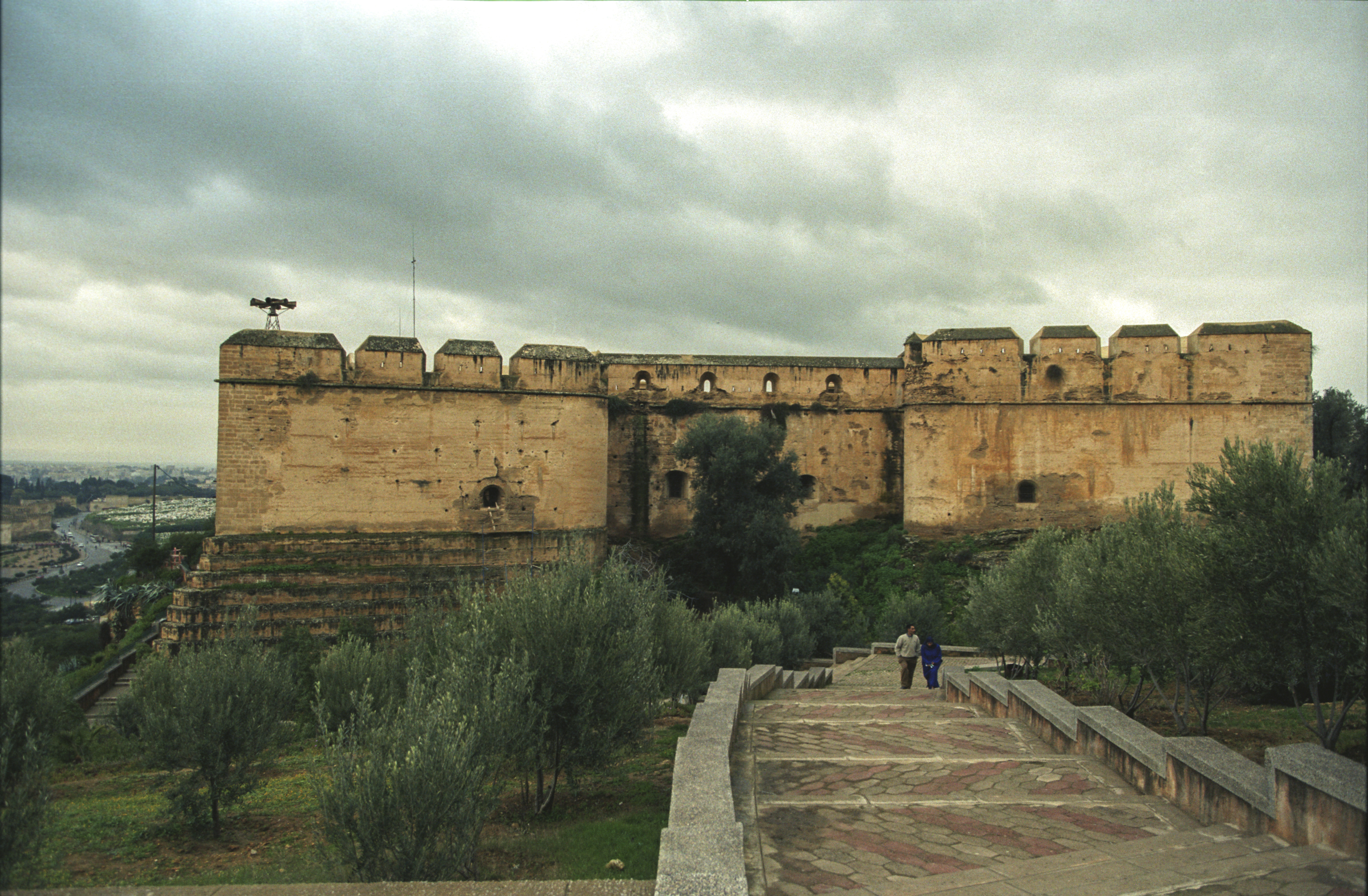
Borj Nord

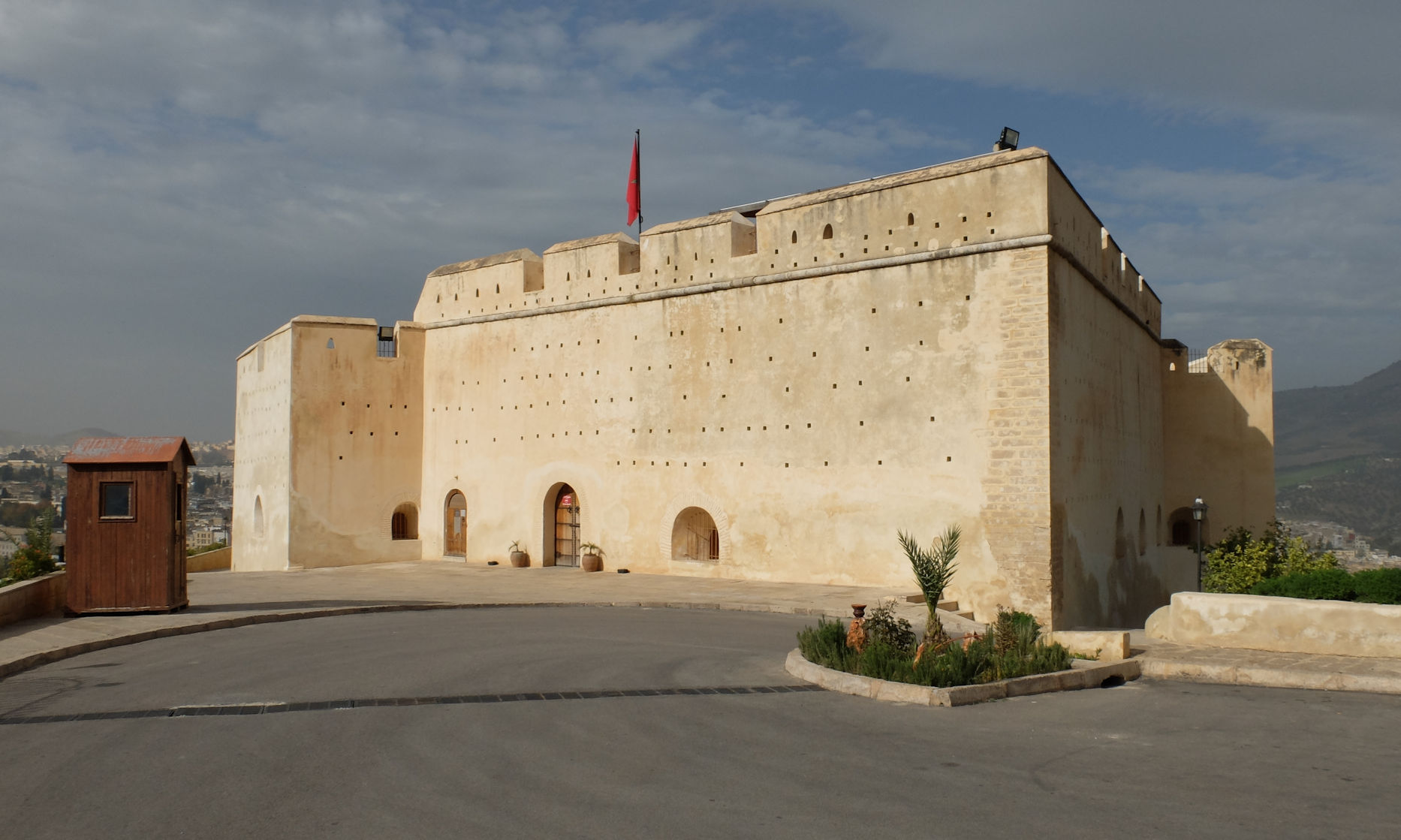
Borj Sud

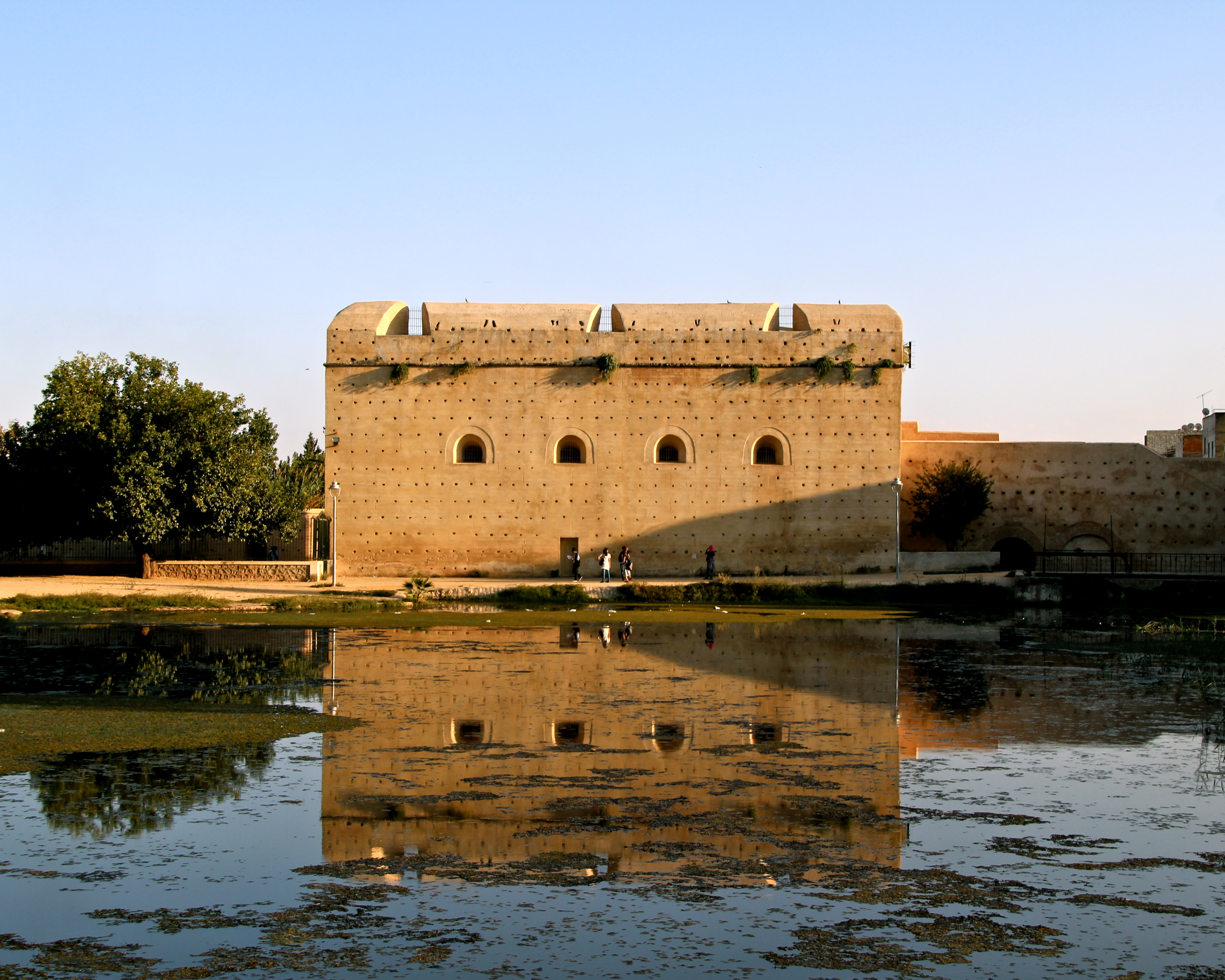
Borj Sheikh Ahmed

=== Bridges ===
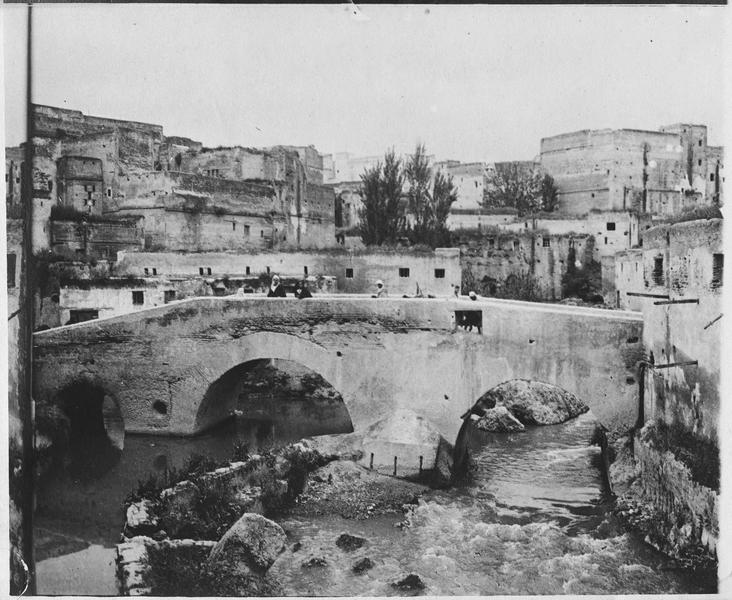
The Bin el-Moudoun Bridge in a 1916 photo, with its three arches still visible

The Oued Bou Khrareb (part of the Oued Fes), which divides the northwestern and southeastern shores of Fes el-Bali, is crossed by several historic bridges, some of which were first built before the unification of the two shores into a single city in the 11th century. There were once at least six bridges, reportedly built by the Zenata emir Dunas ibn Hamama in the early 11th century, before the unification of the two cities by the Almoravids later in the same century. Other scholarly sources, however, attribute at least some of the bridges to the Almoravid period (late 11th to early 12th centuries) when the two early cities of Fes were unified. Many of them were destroyed in subsequent floods in the early 14th century, and only some of them were rebuilt by the Marinid Sultan Abu Sa'id at the time.

Of the bridges that remain today, the Qantrat Bin el-Mudun ("Bridge Between the Two Cities") is the northernmost of them, followed to the south by the Qantrat Sebbaghin ("Bridge of the Tanners") and by the Qantrat Terrafin ("Bridge of the Cobblers") just north of Place R'cif. Another bridge, the Bridge of Sidi al-'Awwad, was located further south but likely disappeared during the 20th century when the river was covered by the modern paved road. The Bin el-Mudun Bridge, believed to date from the time of Emir Dunas ibn Hamama, was considered one of the most picturesque, being located amidst a stretch of rocky rapids. It has a span composed of three arches but only the central one is still visible today. The Sebbaghin Bridge, also known as the Khrashfiyin Bridge (or Khrachfiyine in the French transliteration), is believed to have been originally built by Emir Dunas and restored or rebuilt by the Marinids in the 14th century. The Terrafin bridge, originally named Qantrat Bab al-Silsila and now found on the northern edge of Place R'cif, is also believed to date initially from Emir Dunas in the 11th century. It is notable for having been lined with shops on both sides, a feature still partly visible in its structure today.

Preserved historic bridges over the Oued Bou Khareb (2023 photos)

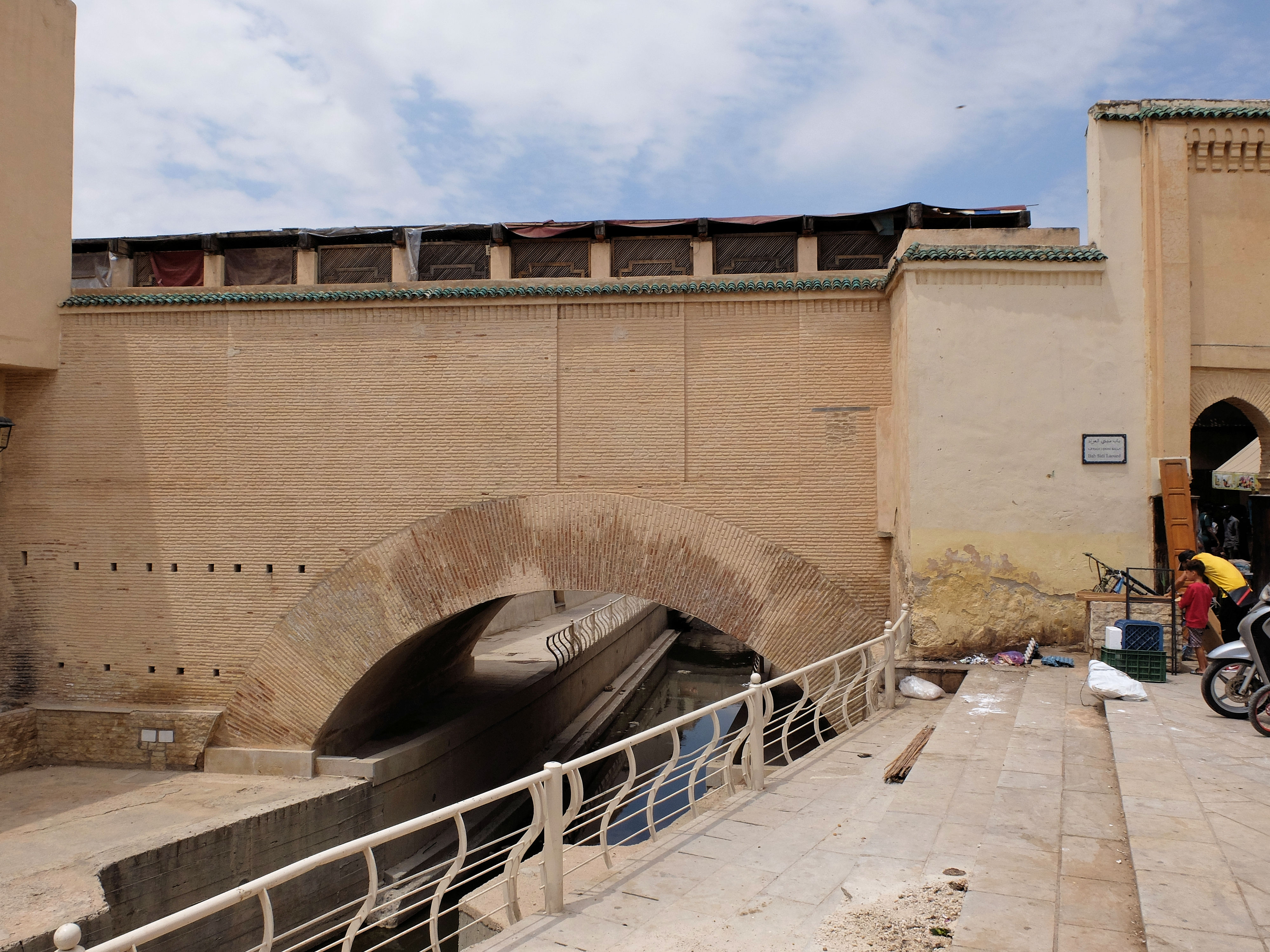
Terrafin Bridge

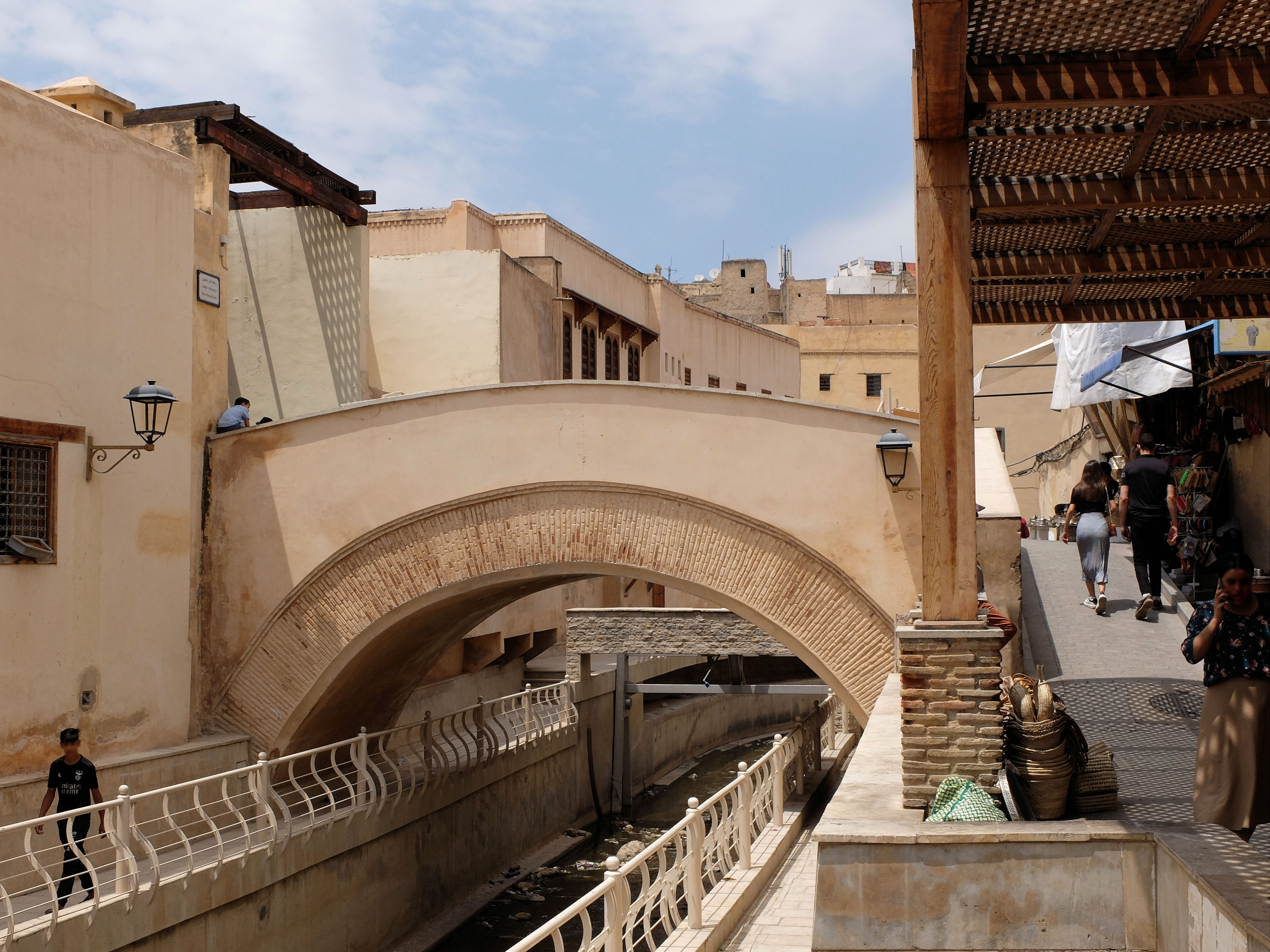
Sebbaghin Bridge

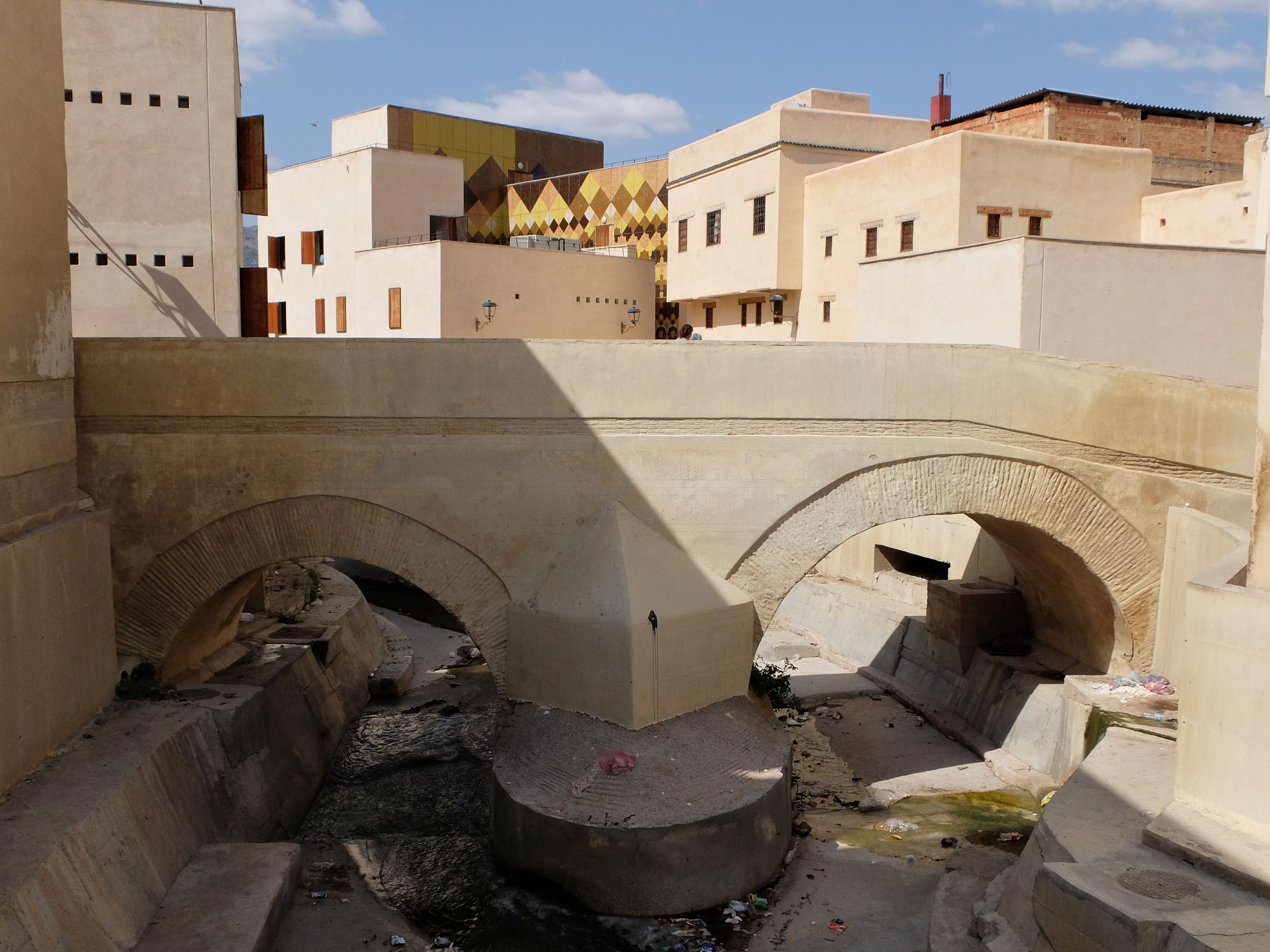
Bin el-Mudun Bridge

=== Water supply system ===
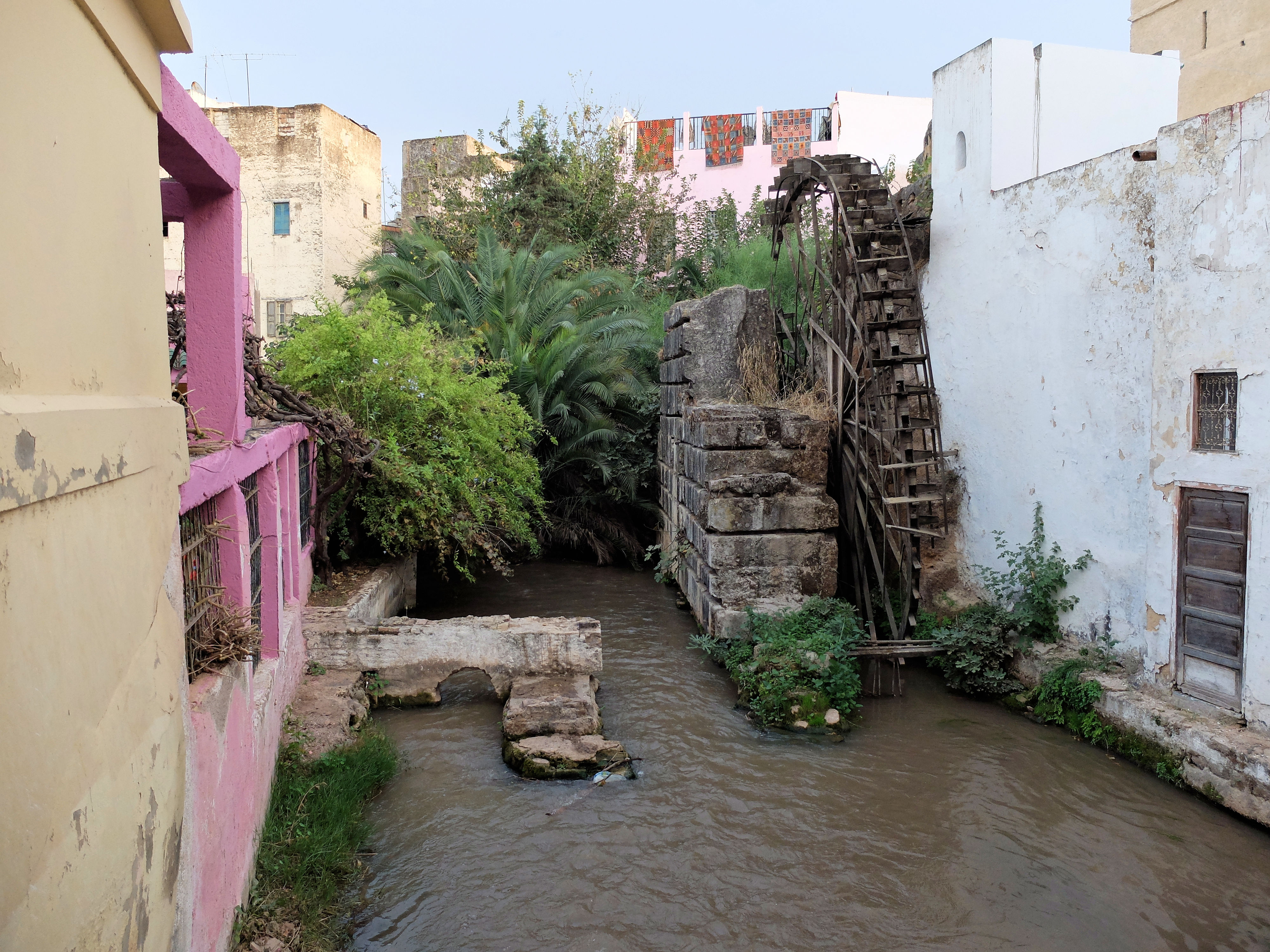
An old noria (right) near Fes Jdid today

The environment of Fez was gifted with plentiful water from an array of small rivers and streams that feed the Oued Fes and flow through the old city. Fes el-Bali was supplied by a complex and extensive system of canals and water channels which distributed water across both shores of the city. The historic water network, which survives today, was begun by Zenata emir Dunas ibn Hamama between 1037 and 1049 and then further elaborated by the Almoravid emir Yusuf ibn Tashfin between 1069 (the Almoravid conquest of Fes) and 1106. Upstream from Fes el-Bali, the main river was also diverted and exploited for the creation of Fes el-Jdid during the Marinid period.

A large number of waterwheels (known as norias, or sometimes saqiyyas) were located throughout the city's water network in order to assist in water distribution or to power certain industries. Some of these were very large, such as the huge noria which supplied the Marinid royal gardens of Mosara, measuring 26 meters in diameter and 2 meters in thickness. Only a few of these waterwheels have survived in some form, including some examples around the Jnan Sbil Gardens.

== List of notable historic monuments ==
=== Religious structures ===
Mosques:

- Al-Qarawiyyin Mosque
- Al-Andalusiyyin Mosque
- Zawiya of Moulay Idris II
- Al-Anouar Mosque (Mosque of the Sheikhs)
- Sharabliyyin Mosque
- Bab Guissa Mosque
- R'cif Mosque
- Bou Jeloud Mosque
- Abu al-Hasan Mosque
- Mosque of the Kasbah an-Nouar
- Diwan Mosque
- el-Oued Mosque
- Ain al-Kheil Mosque
- Grand Mosque of Fes el-Jdid
- Moulay Abdallah Mosque
- Al-Hamra Mosque
- Al-Beida Mosque
- Lalla ez-Zhar Mosque
- Lalla Ghriba Mosque

Synagogues:

- Ibn Danan Synagogue
- Slat al Fassiyin Synagogue

Madrasas:

- Saffarin Madrasa
- Sahrij Madrasa
- Sba'iyyin Madrasa
- Al-Attarine Madrasa
- Mesbahiyya Madrasa
- Bou Inania Madrasa
- Cherratine Madrasa
- Madrasa Fes el-Jdid (Madrasa Dar al-Makhzen)
- Madrasa el-Oued
- Madrasa Muhammadiyya (Madrasa Mohammadia)

Zawiyas and mausoleums:

- Zawiya of Moulay Idris II
- Zawiya of Sidi Ahmed al-Tijani
- Zawiya of Sidi Abdelkader al-Fassi
- Zawiya of Sidi Ahmed esh-Shawi
- Zawiya of Sidi Taoudi Ben Souda
- Zawiya of Sidi Ali Boughaleb
- Marabout of Sidi Harazem
- Marinid Tombs (ruined)

=== Civic and commercial structures ===
Funduqs (caravanserais):

- Funduq al-Najjariyyin
- Funduq Staouniyyin (Funduq al-Tetwaniyyin)
- Funduq Sagha
- Funduq al-Shamma'in & Funduq Sbitriyyin
- Funduq Barka
- Funduq Kettanin

Tanneries:

- Chouara Tannery
- Sidi Moussa Tannery
- Ain Azliten Tannery

Hammams (bathhouses):

- Hammam Ben Abbad
- Hammam al-Mokhfiya
- Hammam Saffarin

=== Fortifications ===
Walls:

- City walls

Forts:

- Borj Nord
- Borj Sud
- Kasbah An-Nouar
- Kasbah Cherarda
- Kasbah Tamdert
- Dar Debibagh
- Borj Sheikh Ahmed, Borj Twil, and Borj Sidi Bou Nafa' (Saadian bastions in the eastern and southeastern wall of Fes Jdid)

City gates:

- Bab al-Amer
- Bab Bou Jeloud
- Bab Dekkakin (Bab es-Sebaa)
- Bab Ftouh
- Bab Guissa
- Bab Mahrouk
- Bab Semmarine
- Bab Segma

=== Palaces and historic houses ===
- Dar al-Makhzen (Royal Palace)
- Dar Batha
- Mnebhi Palace
- Dar Adiyel
- Dar Ba Mohammed Chergui
- Dar Belghazi
- Dar Glaoui
- Dar Moqri
- Jamai Palace

=== Other landmarks ===
- Dar al-Magana (Water clock)
- Maristan of Sidi Frej (historic hospital)
- Kissariat al-Kifah (bazaar)
- Borj Neffara (observation tower)
- Dar al-Makina (19th-century arms factory)
- Jnan Sbil Gardens
- Bridges of the Oued Bou Khrareb
