= Al-Beida Mosque =

Mosque in Fez, Morocco

al-Beida Mosque
- جامع البيضاء
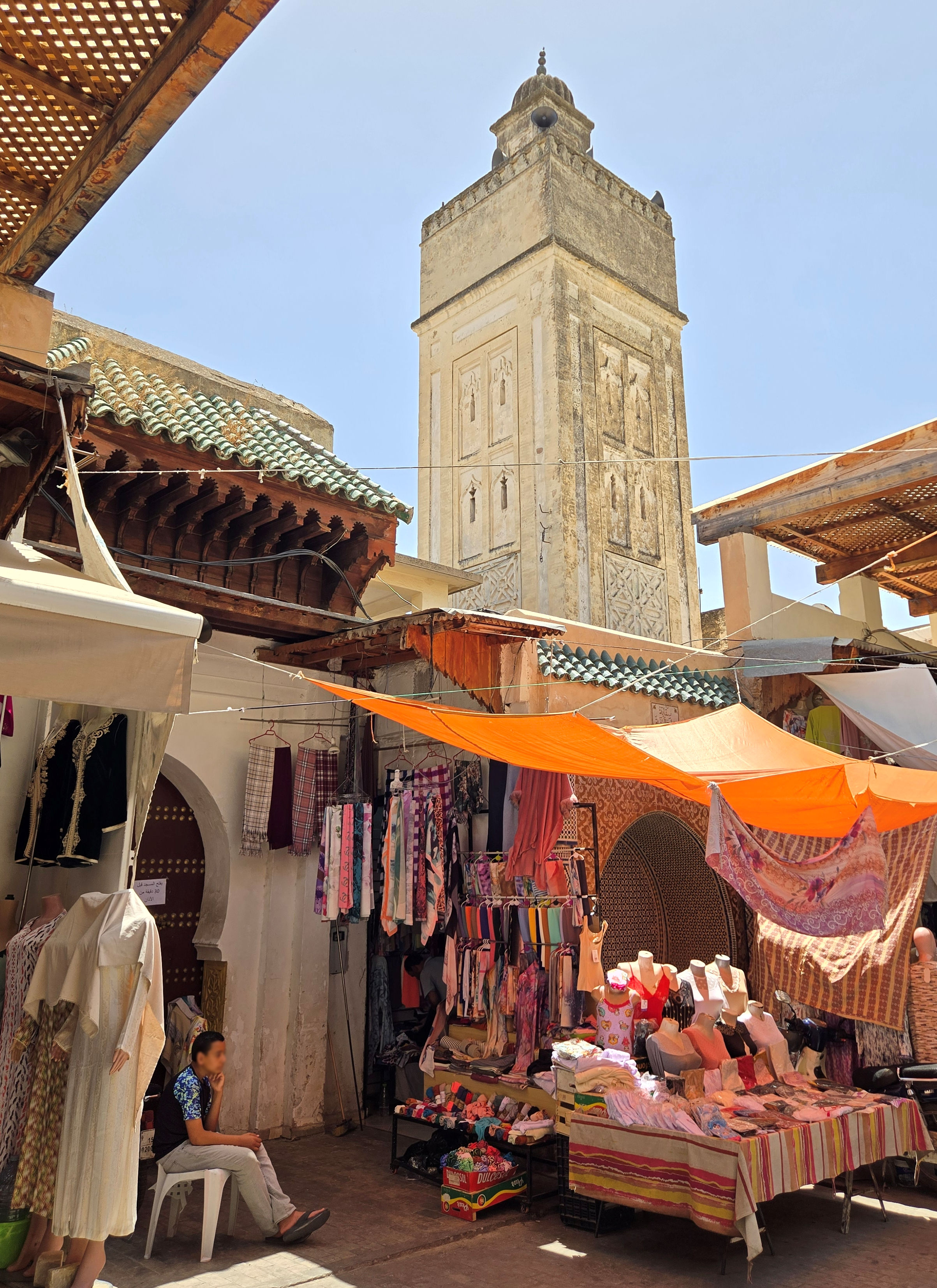
- The minaret (centre right), rising above the mosque's entrance and fountain (left and lower right, respectively; partly obscured by shops)

Religion
- Affiliation: Sunni Islam

Location
- Location: Fez, Morocco
- Interactive map of al-Beida Mosque
- Coordinates: 34°03′21.5″N 4°59′24.9″W

Architecture
- Type: Mosque
- Style: Moorish

Specifications
- Minaret: 1
- Minaret height: (approx.) 12.85 m
- Materials: brick, wood

The al-Beida Mosque (Arabic: جامع البيضاء, lit. 'White Mosque') is a mosque in Fes el-Jdid in the historic old city of Fez, Morocco.

== History ==
According to 20th-century scholar Roger Le Tourneau, the mosque was built some time after the nearby al-Hamra Mosque, which was built in the Marinid period. Another 20th-century scholar, Boris Maslow, wrote that the building's layout showed indications that it started out as a small interior space (near the mihrab today) and that it was subsequently expanded to the larger complex seen today. The expansion probably consisted of the courtyard (sahn) and its surrounding gallery which, unusually, are wider than the main prayer hall itself and thus appear to have been added afterwards. The minaret of the mosque would also date from this expansion.

The mosque's name, jama' beida or jama' al-beida, means either "White Mosque" or "Mosque of the White One". Since the form of the word beida (or bayda) is grammatically feminine, Le Tourneau suggested that it refers to either a white minaret or a "white lady" (both plausible and grammatically feminine words).

== Architecture ==
=== Exterior ===
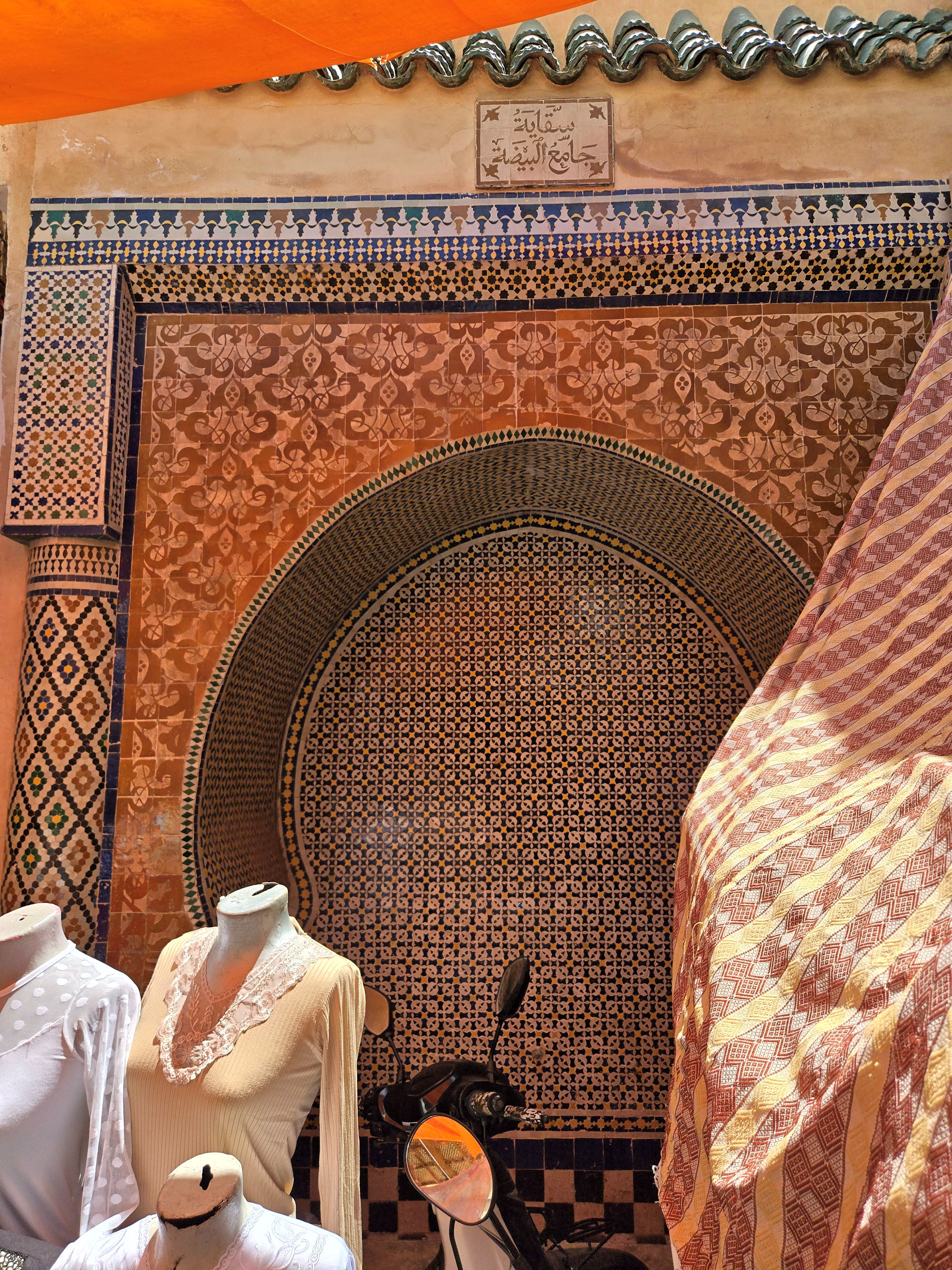
The street fountain of the mosque, covered in decorative tilework

The entrance of the mosque is located on the Grande Rue (main street) of Fes el-Jdid, projecting from the main building on its western side but now flanked by shops and other structures. The gateway consists of a horseshoe arch with some carved stucco decoration, sheltered by a small overhanging canopy of carved wood topped with green roof tiles. Next to the entrance is a historic public fountain set into the exterior wall of the mosque and decorated with colourful tiles, including zellij mosaics. The minaret of the mosque stands behind and slightly to the right (or south) of the entrance and the fountain.

=== Interior ===
The entrance leads to a nearly square courtyard (sahn) measuring 8.17 by 8.47 metres (26.8 by 27.8 ft) and surrounded by an arcaded gallery. The floor of the courtyard is covered in zellij tilework and at its middle is a fountain with a marble basin. On the courtyard's south side, the gallery gives access to the main prayer hall, which is less wide than the courtyard's gallery. This prayer space which is further divided by a row of slightly unequal arches. The mihrab (niche symbolizing the direction of prayer) has the same form as most traditional Moroccan mihrabs but is relatively simple and undecorated.

In the corner between the prayer hall, the courtyard, and the minaret is an ablutions room which can be entered directly from the street but which was also once accessible by a passage from the main courtyard as well. The room is centered around a rectangular water basin and is flanked by seven smaller rooms which served as latrines.

=== Minaret ===
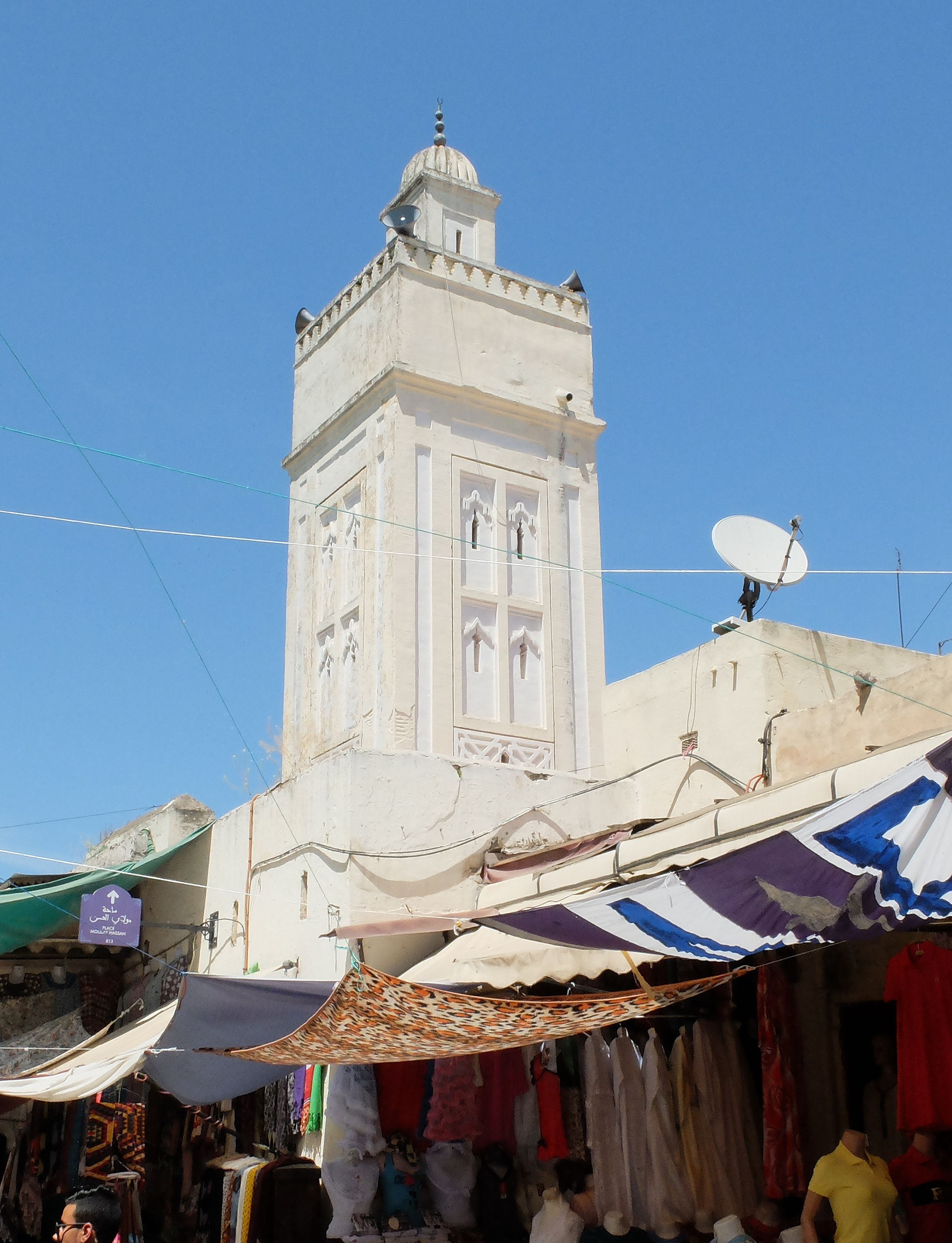
The minaret of the mosque (2015 photo)

The minaret has a square shaft and an overall form typical of Moroccan minarets. Its main shaft is 12.6 metres (41 ft) tall and each of its sides is 2.82 metres (9.3 ft) wide. The small secondary shaft above this is 3.25 metres (10.7 ft) tall, and topped by a cupola. The surface of the minaret is covered in whitewash and is decorated relatively simply with carved reliefs of geometric patterns and outlines around the narrow windows.

== See also ==
- Lists of mosques
- List of mosques in Africa
- List of mosques in Morocco
