= Al-Hamra Mosque =

Mosque in Fez, Morocco

al-Hamra Mosque
- الجامع الاحمر (Arabic) ⵎⴻⵣⴳⵉⴷⴰ ⴰⵣⴻⴳⴰⴴ (Berber)
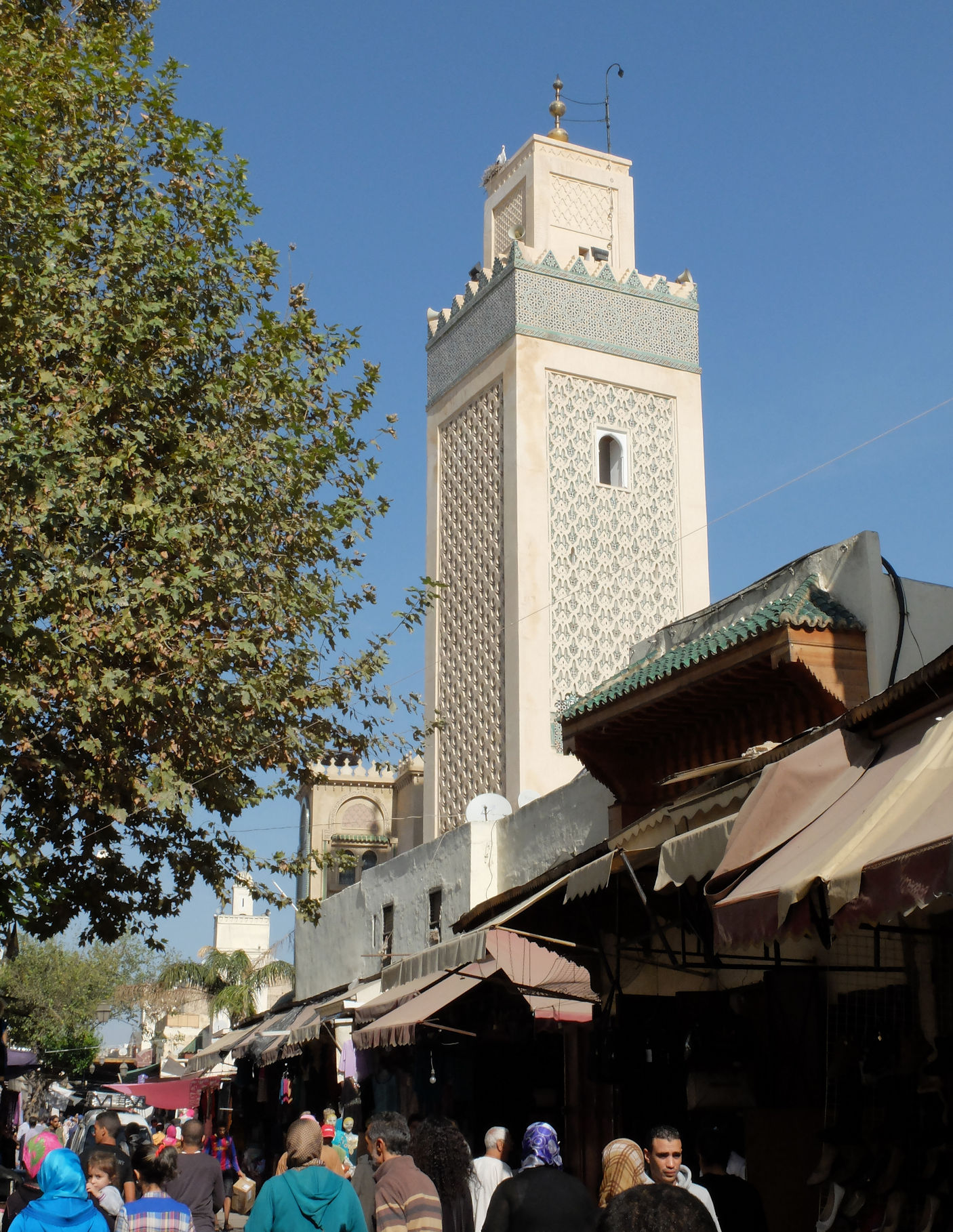
- The minaret of the al-Hamra Mosque, standing over the Grande Rue of Fes el-Jdid.

Religion
- Affiliation: Sunni Islam
- Status: active

Location
- Location: Fes, Morocco
- Interactive map of al-Hamra Mosque
- Coordinates: 34°03′19.1″N 4°59′23.9″W

Architecture
- Type: mosque
- Style: Moorish (Marinid)
- Founder: Abu al-Hasan
- Established: 14th century (uncertain)

Specifications
- Minaret: 1
- Minaret height: (approx.) 23.8 m
- Materials: brick, wood

The al-Hamra Mosque or Red Mosque (Arabic: الجامع الاحمر) is a mosque in Fez, Morocco. It was built during the Marinid period as a local Friday mosque in Fes el-Jdid, the palace-city founded by the Marinid rulers, along what is now the main street (Grande Rue).

== Historical background ==
=== Foundation ===
The mosque has never been precisely dated as it lacks any foundation inscription, but it is known to have been built in the Marinid period, almost certainly in the 14th century. Roger Le Tourneau suggested it was most likely built at the end of the 13th century or at the beginning of the 14th century. Henri Bresolette argued that the mosque must date from before 1323 because it is mentioned in a waqf inscription from that year at the Sahrij Madrasa. Georges Marçais suggested, on the basis of its strong similarity to the Sidi Boumediene Mosque in Tlemcen, that it was built by the same architect and under the same ruler as the latter, thus placing its foundation in the reign of Sultan Abu al-Hasan, between 1331 and 1348. Author Richard Parker gives the date as 1339 (but does not indicate what sources this is based on). Other dates suggested by more recent authors include the mid-14th century, during the reign of Sultan Abu Inan (1348–1358), and 1320, during the reign of Abu Sa'id Uthman.

There is also an ablutions house (mida'a), a hammam, and a group of shops built together across the street are also associated with the mosque, although there have been no studies yet to clarify whether this complex was part of the original construction and design of the mosque.

=== Name ===
The mosque's name, jama' hamra or jama' al-hamra means either "Red Mosque" or "Mosque of the Red One". Since the form of the word hamra is grammatically feminine, Le Tourneau suggested that it refers to either a red minaret or a red woman (both plausible and grammatically feminine words). Before it was renovated with added zellij decoration, the minaret's original colour may have been closer to a shade of red, which is another hypothesis. Boris Maslow reported that one legend attributes the mosque to an unidentified "Red Sultan", but that a more plausible legend attributes it to a "red woman" of the Banu Marin (Marinid) clan who came from the Tafilalt and devoted her fortune to building the mosque. In such a case, the mosque would also be known as the Jama' Lalla Hamra ("Mosque of the Red Woman").

== Architecture ==
=== Overview ===
The mosque has a similar layout to the nearby Great Mosque of Fes el-Jdid and other major Marinid mosques of the time. The mosque has a rectangular floor plan with a rectangular courtyard (sahn) in its northern part, which is surrounded by arcaded galleries on three sides and by the main prayer hall to the south. The minaret is located at the northwestern corner, overlooking the main street. The mosque has three entrances, one to the north on the building's central axis, and two more to the east and west at the courtyard's southern corners. The mosque has sloped wooden roofs, covered above by green tiles, typical of Moroccan mosques.

=== The courtyard (sahn) ===
The courtyard, surrounded by arched galleries, measures 11.3 by 13.7 metres. At its center is (or formerly was) a central fountain with a marble basin, while under the gallery on its southwestern corner is a wall fountain decorated with zellij mosaic tilework; both served to help with ablutions. A sundial is found on one of the pillars on the northern arcade of the courtyard.

=== The prayer hall ===
Like most Moroccan mosques, the mosque's interior is a hypostyle space with rows of Moorish arches running perpendicular to the southern qibla wall. Another row of arches runs close and parallel to the southern wall, forming a transverse nave or aisle in front of the mihrab and the qibla wall. The wooden ceilings of the prayer hall's naves are made in the Moroccan berchla style, with wooden frames and beams arranged to form geometric motifs. These date from the original Marinid construction.

The square space directly in front of the mihrab is decorated with stucco-carved surfaces and is covered by a wood-frame dome forming a geometric star patterns and highlighted with painted decoration. The dome's transition to the square space below is formed by muqarnas carving. The mihrab itself consists of an alcove covered by a muqarnas cupola behind a horseshoe arch, while the wall around the mihrab is covered in typical stucco-carved decoration with arabesque, calligraphic, and geometric motifs. Contrary to many other surviving Marinid mosques, the decoration of this mihrab, as well as the adjacent wooden cupola, appear to still date from the Marinid period. Three stucco-grilled windows are set in the wall above the mihrab, as is also common in other mosques. There is a door on either side of the mihrab; the right one leads to the storage room for the minbar, while the left one leads to the imam's chamber and the jama' al-gna'iz, a small oratory dedicated to funerary rites.

=== The minaret ===
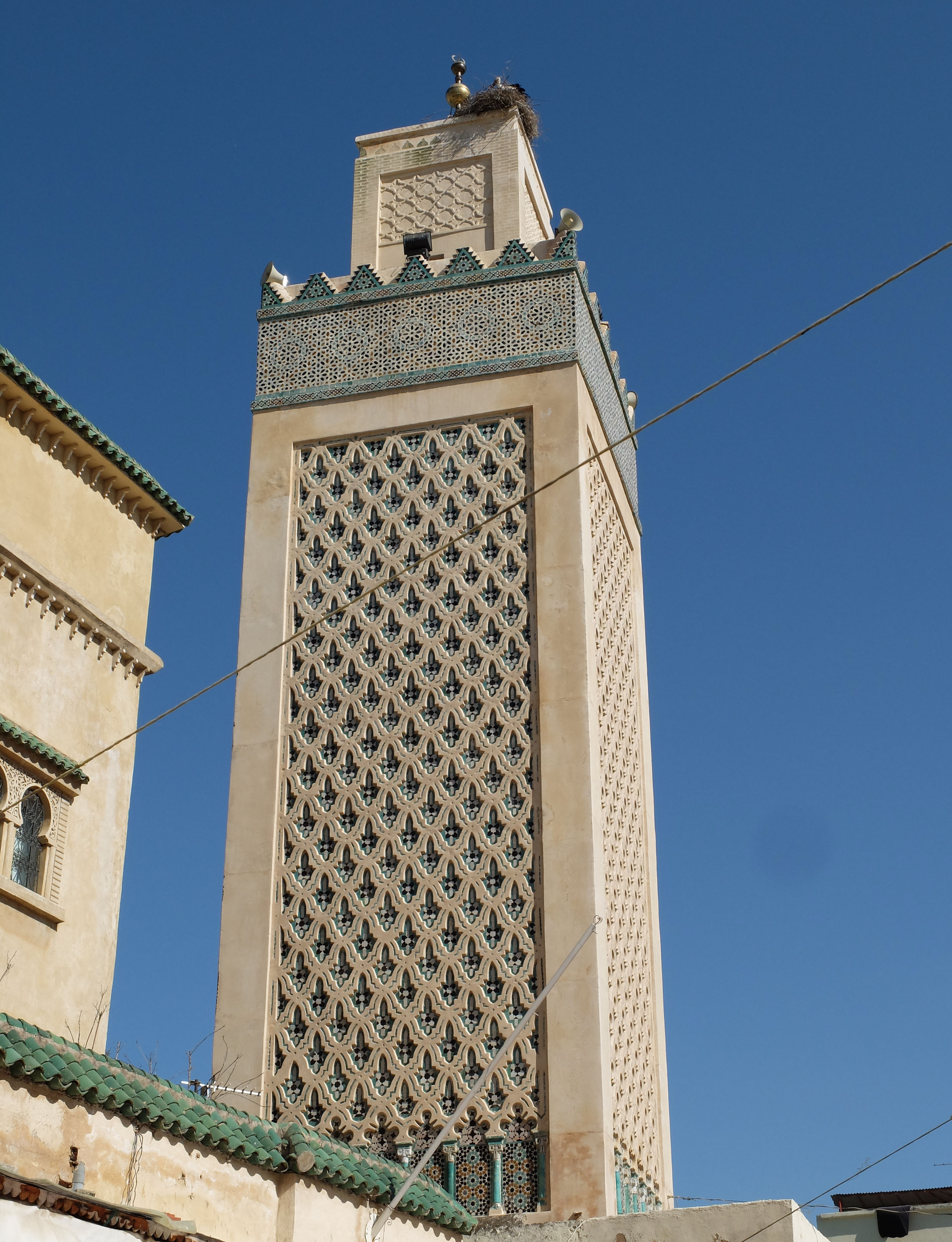
The minaret (northern facade), with darj wa ktaf motifs covering much of its surface.

The minaret has square base measuring 4.5 metres per side. The main shaft of the minaret is 19.2 metres tall, above which is a secondary mini-tower (2.5 metres per side and 4.6 metres high) topped by a small dome and a metal finial with spheres. The interior of the minaret is climbed via a long staircase which wraps around the square-based core of the tower, leading to a platform at the top of the main shaft. The only windows are found on the southern side of the minaret.

The facades of the minaret are covered by typical Moroccan motifs. While they appear similar at a glance, each motif is slightly different, featuring a variation of the darj wa ktaf (or sebka) pattern. Along the bottom of each façade is a row of blind arches which blend into the motif above and are filled with mosaic (zellij) tilework. Around the top of the main shaft, above the main motifs, is a broad band of more zellij tilework with geometric patterns. Above this, the main tower is crowned by decorative merlons, also covered in geometric tilework.

Boris Maslow claimed that the southern and eastern sides of the minaret, as well as the secondary shaft at its summit, where damaged at some point and remade in modern times. The colourful zellij tilework which fills the empty spaces of the darj-wa-ktaf motifs in the middle of the minaret's façades was likely added in the late 18th or early 19th century, perhaps in the reign of Moulay Slimane when similar tile decoration was added to other Marinid minarets (e.g. the Chrabliyine Mosque and the Mosque of Abu al-Hasan).

== See also ==
- Lists of mosques
- List of mosques in Africa
- List of mosques in Morocco
