= Great Mosque, Rabat =

Mosque in Rabat, Morocco

Great Mosque
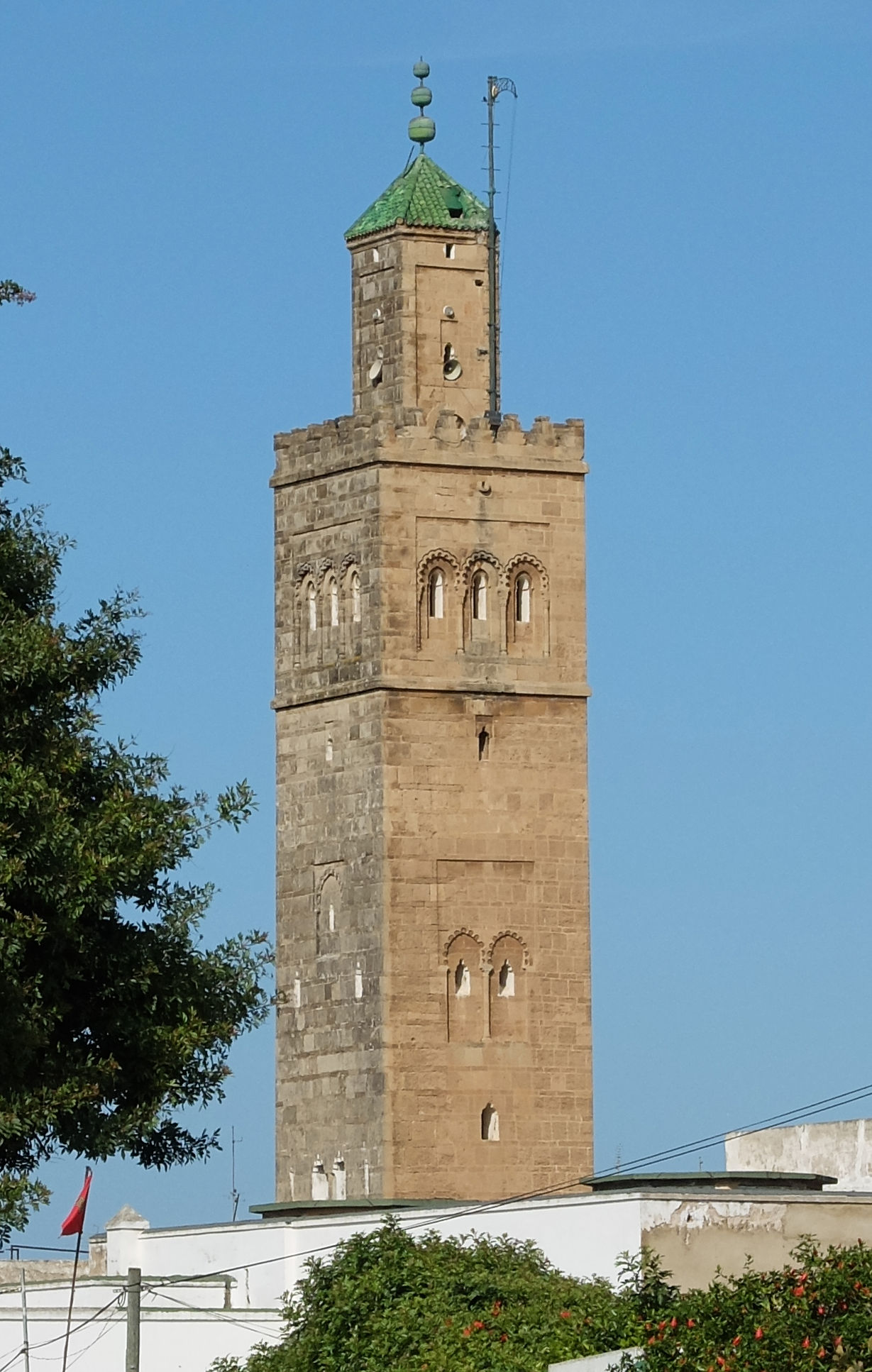

- Location within Morocco

Religion
- Affiliation: Islam

Location
- Municipality: Rabat
- Country: Morocco
- Coordinates: 34°1′32.8″N 6°50′1.2″W

Architecture
- Type: mosque

Specifications
- Minaret: 1
- Minaret height: 33.15 m

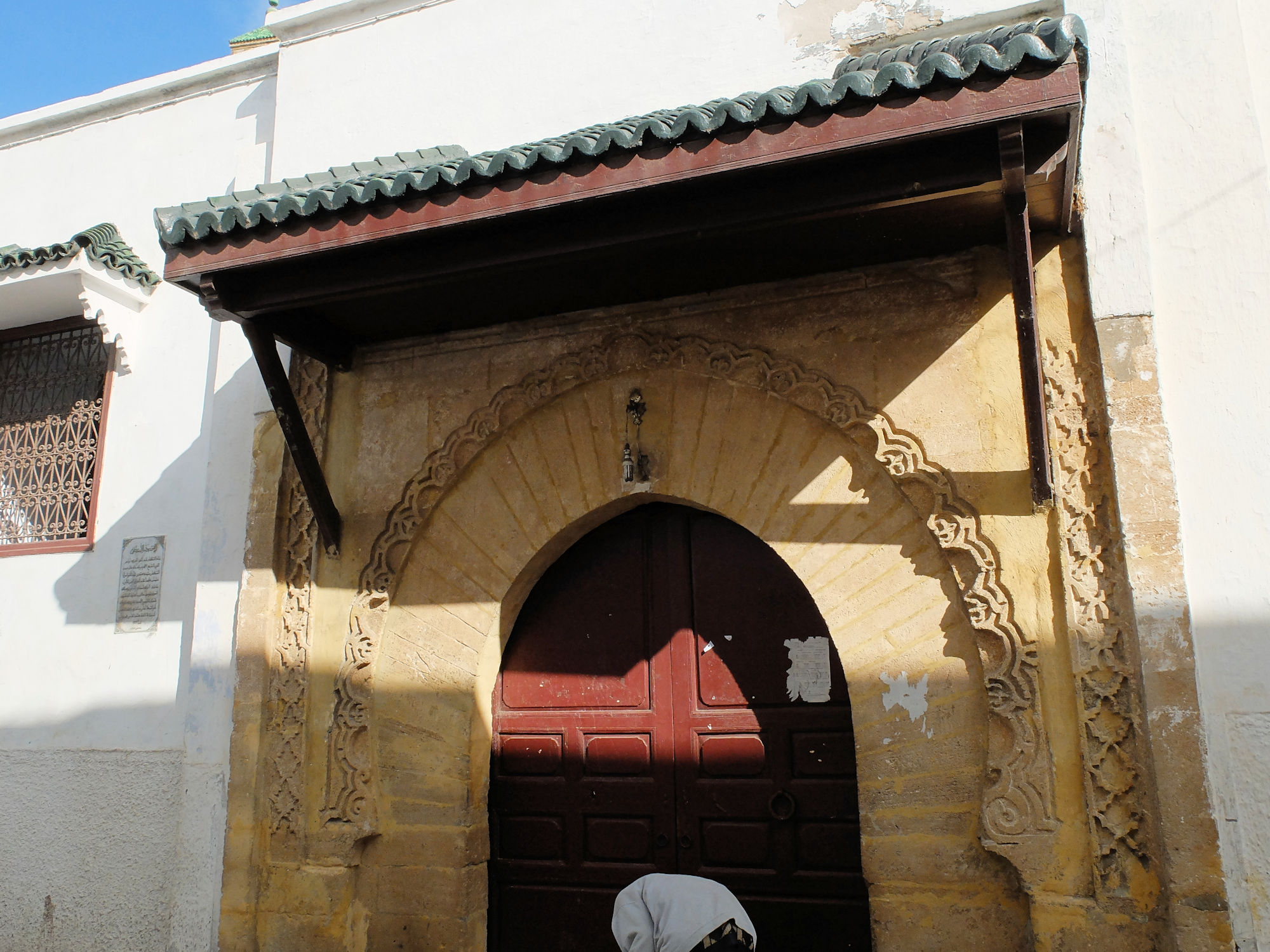
One of the main gates of the mosque.

The Great Mosque (Arabic: الجامع الكبير, romanized: al-jama' al-kbir) of the medina of Rabat in Morocco, also known as the el-Kharrazin Mosque (Arabic: خرازين, romanized: jama' al-kharrazin, lit. 'mosque of the cobblers'), is the largest Friday mosque within the historic Andalusian medina of Rabat (i.e. the district north of the Andalusian walls, along Avenue Hassan II today) in Morocco. The mosque is located at the intersection of the streets of Souk Sebbat and Rue Bab Chellah ("Street of the Chellah Gate").

== History ==
The mosque was originally built in the Marinid period in the late 13th or early 14th century, but it has been reconstructed and restored many times since. An extensive restoration took place in 1882, and the current minaret was built in 1939.

== Description ==
The mosque covers an area of about 1800 square meters and its minaret has a height of 33.15 meters. The mosque has six gates and follows a traditional layout for Moroccan mosques (i.e. a courtyard or sahn and an interior prayer hypostyle hall).

== See also ==
- Moulay Slimane Mosque
- As-Sunnah Mosque
- Great Mosque of Salé
- Lists of mosques
- List of mosques in Africa
- List of mosques in Morocco
