= R'cif Mosque =

Mosque in Fez, Morocco

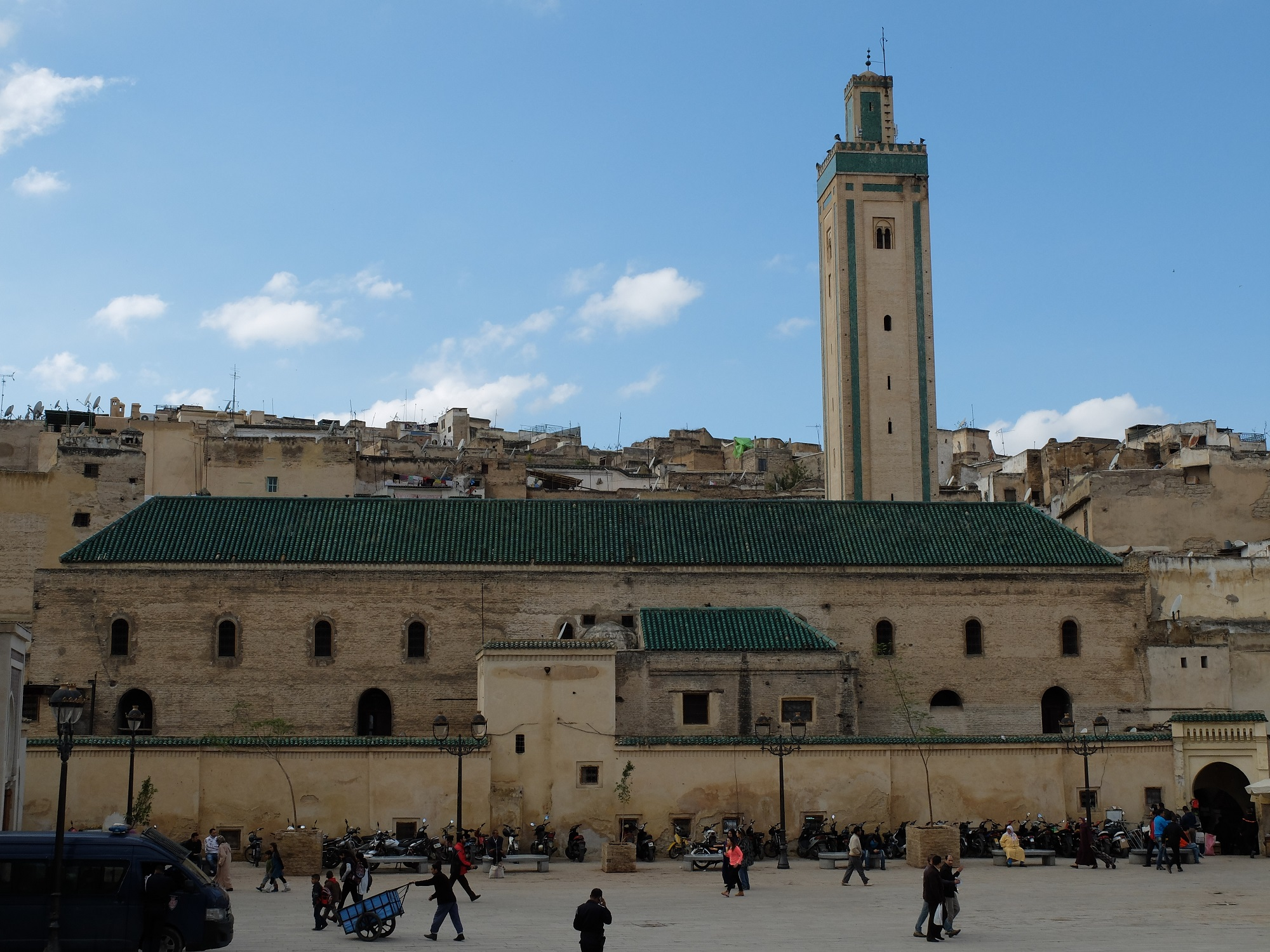

Religion
- Affiliation: Sunni Islam
- Status: active

Location
- Location: Fez, Morocco
- Interactive map of R'cif Mosque
- Coordinates: 34°03′45.15″N 4°58′23.9″W

Architecture
- Type: Mosque
- Style: Moorish (Alawi)
- Founder: Moulay Slimane
- Completed: Between 1792 and 1822
- Minaret: 1

The R'cif Mosque (Arabic: جامع الرصيف; also transliterated as R'sif, Ercif, er-Rsif, or Rasif) is a congregational mosque in Fes el-Bali, the old city (medina) of Fez, Morocco. It has one of the tallest minarets in the city and overlooks Place R'cif in the heart of the medina.

== Location and name ==
The mosque is located just west of Place R'cif, a large public square created in the 20th century to provide easier access to the interior of the medina (it is one of the only places inside the medina that can be reached by car). Its name means "Mosque of the Paved Road". It was built on a cliffside along the shore of the Bou Khrareb River (Oued Bou Khrareb) which passes through the center of the city, though the river is now hidden underground between Place R'Cif and the south edge of the city. The mosque is also near the central souqs (markets) of the city, stretching downhill from the Qarawiyyin area.

== History ==
=== Construction ===
The mosque was built in the 18th century during the reign of the Alawi sultan Moulay Slimane (1792-1822). (Although some authors attribute it to the reign of Moulay Mohammed bin Abdallah between 1757 and 1790.) It is recorded that Moulay Slimane commissioned two marble fountains and a marble water basin which were placed in the mosque's courtyard (sahn) in 1797. The sultan's architect in charge of these works was al-Hassan al-Soudani.

=== Role in the 1937 protests ===
The mosque was a prominent rallying point during the riots and protests that occurred across multiple Moroccan cities in late 1937 against the French Protectorate authorities. The protests were sparked by food shortages which threatened local tribes, dispossessed of their best lands by the French, with starvation. They were exacerbated by the French authorities' violent suppression of protests in Meknes (near Fez), killing 13 people and injuring more. Not long after, protests spread to Fez. Crowds of demonstrators used the R'cif and Qarawiyyin Mosques as gathering points before marching out into the city, with 1500 marching from the R'cif mosque alone. On October 28, French authorities sent troops to occupy the entire medina, including the mosques. This resulted in a confrontation inside the mosque during which 6 people were injured by grenades thrown by French troops. Order was eventually reestablished soon after, but the protests were one of the pivotal points in the evolution the Moroccan nationalist movement, which transitioned from a reformist agenda to demands for independence.

== Architecture ==
The mosque occupies an area of roughly 1500 square meters. The mosque features one of the tallest minarets in the old city, making it very prominent on the skyline, especially from the south. The minaret has a square base and is decorated simply with bands of green faience. The main gate of the mosque opens on its west side, facing a small public square. It is decorated with a carved geometric pattern inside a square frame, typical of the Almohad and Marinid architectural legacies, filled with predominantly green tiles decorated with arabesques and small areas of mosaic tiles (zellij). Above the gate is an ornately carved wooden canopy, likely of cedar, also typical of Moroccan architecture, and further above and behind rises the minaret of the mosque. Inside the mosque is a wide courtyard (sahn) surrounded by arcaded galleries, at the center of is a rectangular water basin (to aid in ablutions) under a small roofed pavilion. On the east side of the courtyard is a large roofed prayer hall marked by rows of horseshoe arches. This overall layout is similar to other Moroccan mosques. The mihrab is also very traditional, consisting of an alcove with a horseshoe arch resting on engaged columns of marble (reused from Saadian monuments), surrounded by carved stucco decoration of typical Moroccan arabesque motifs and calligraphic inscriptions, highlighted with painted colours.

In addition to being a Friday mosque (i.e. a large mosque that accommodates Friday prayers and hosts a khutba), it also hosted a small library of books for use in the mosque. The mosque also had a public street fountain to offer water to local residents.

== Gallery ==
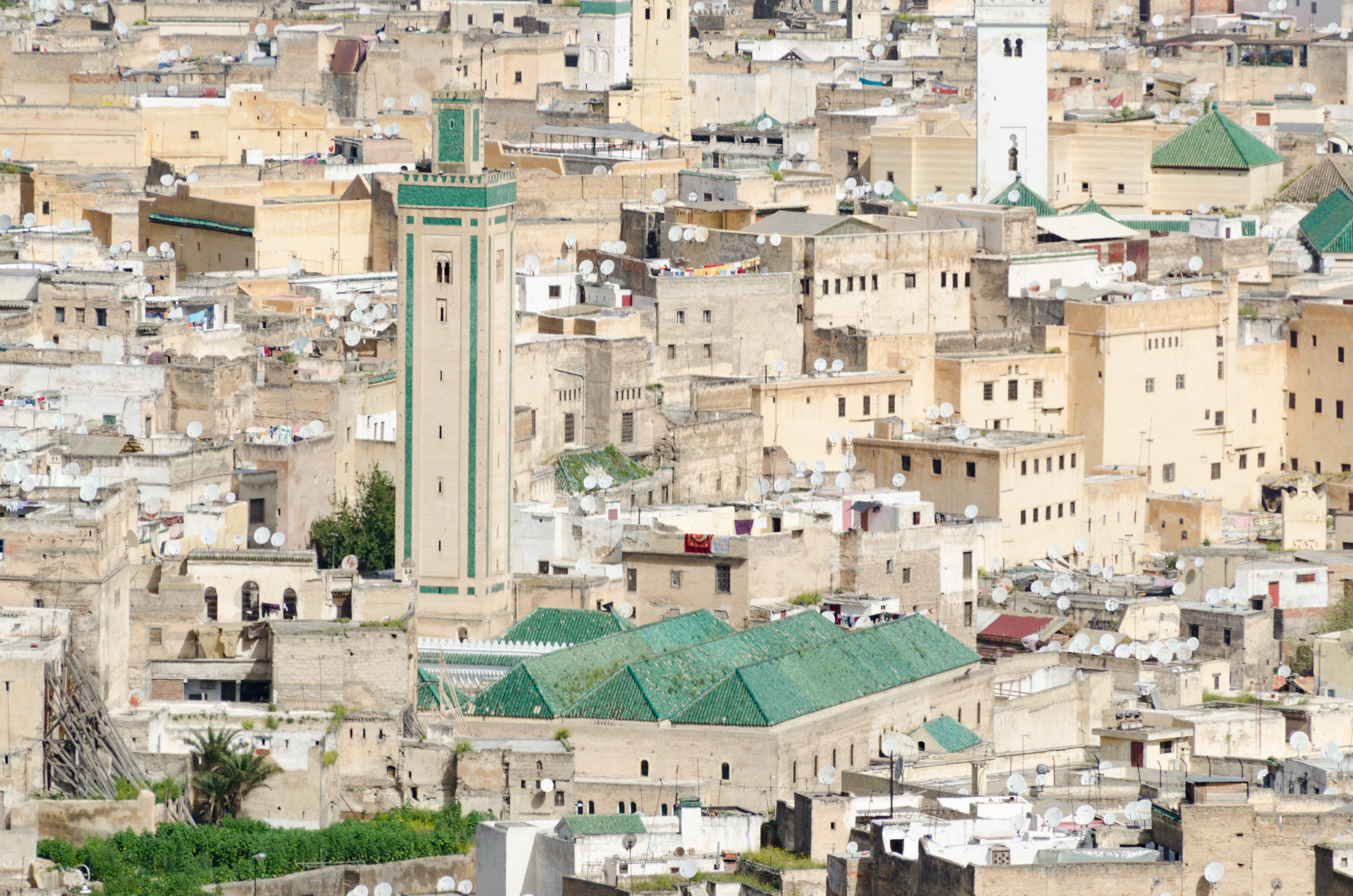
R'cif Mosque seen from the south (the white minaret in the upper right is that of the Qarawiyyin Mosque)

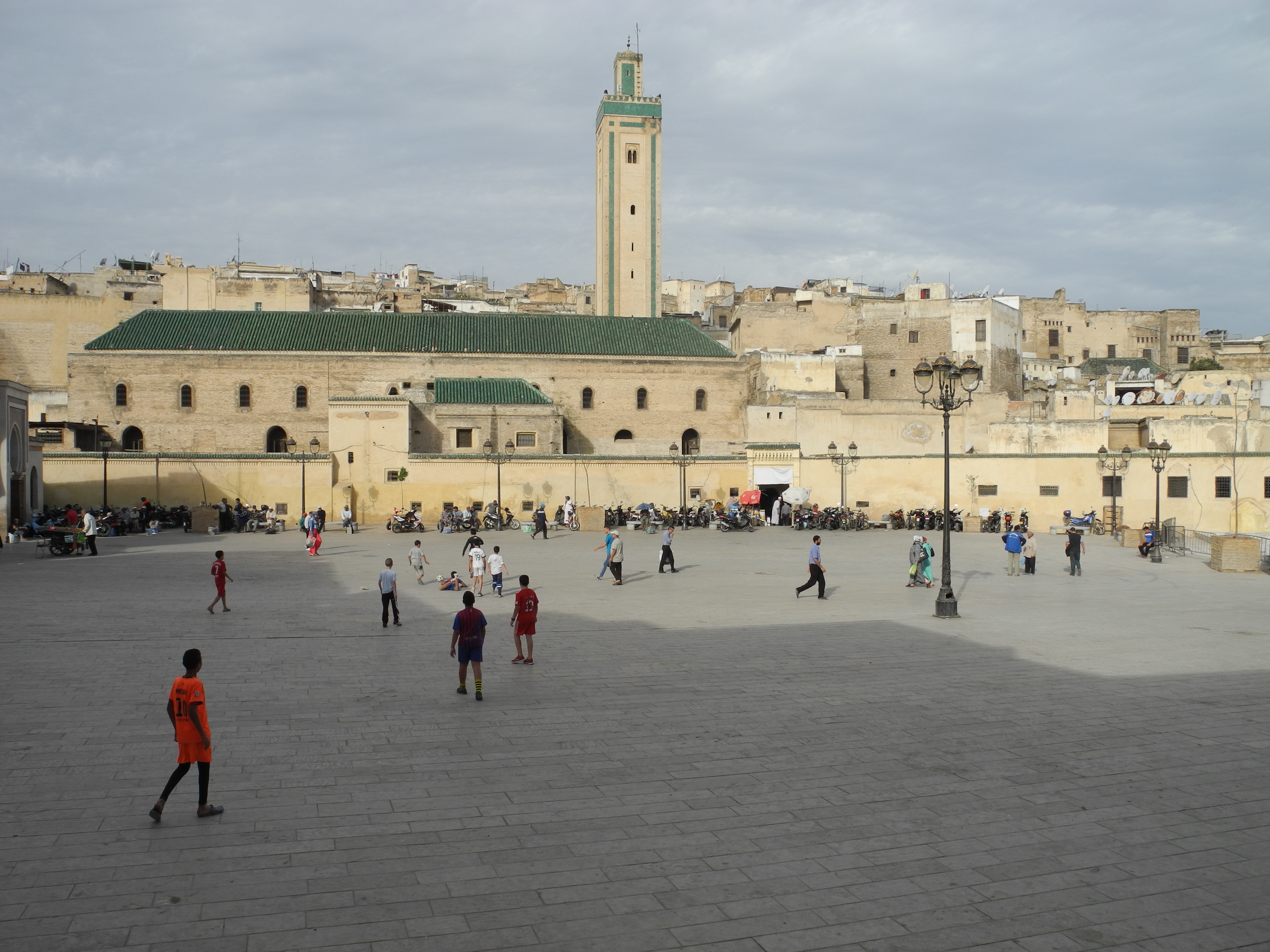
The mosque seen from Place R'cif (R'cif Square)

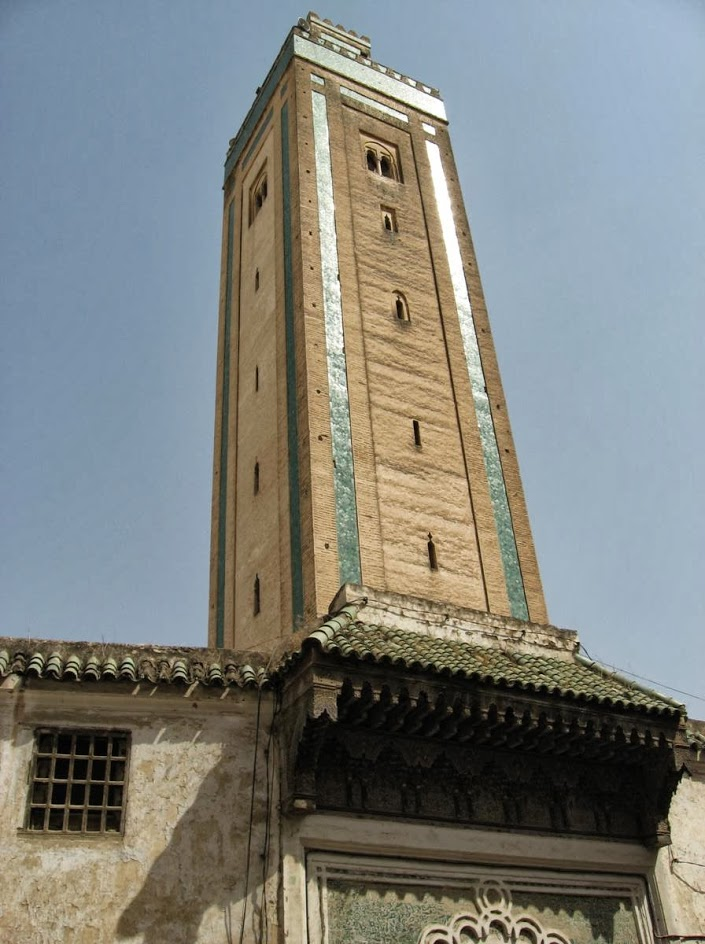
The minaret

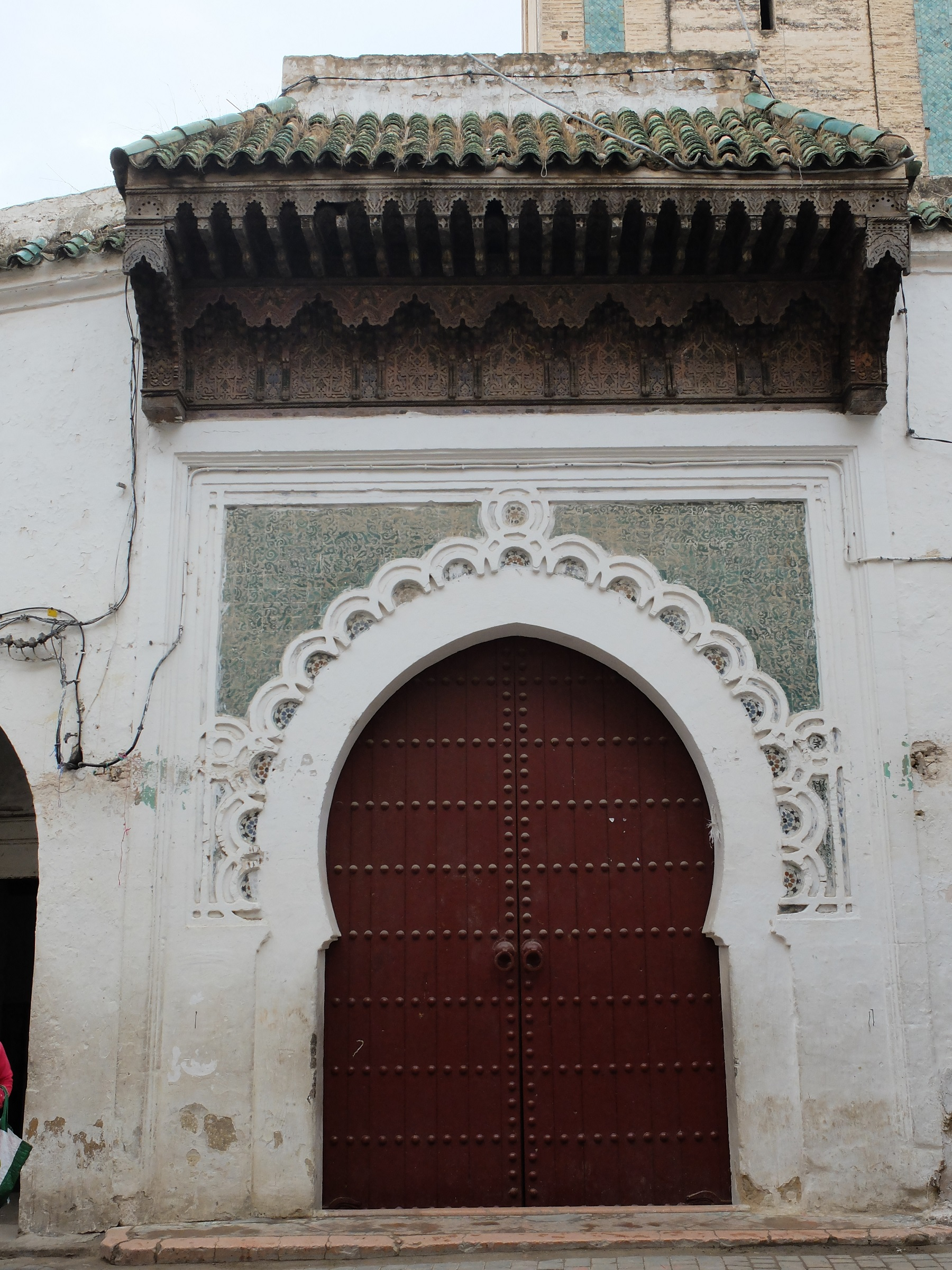
The main doors of the mosque

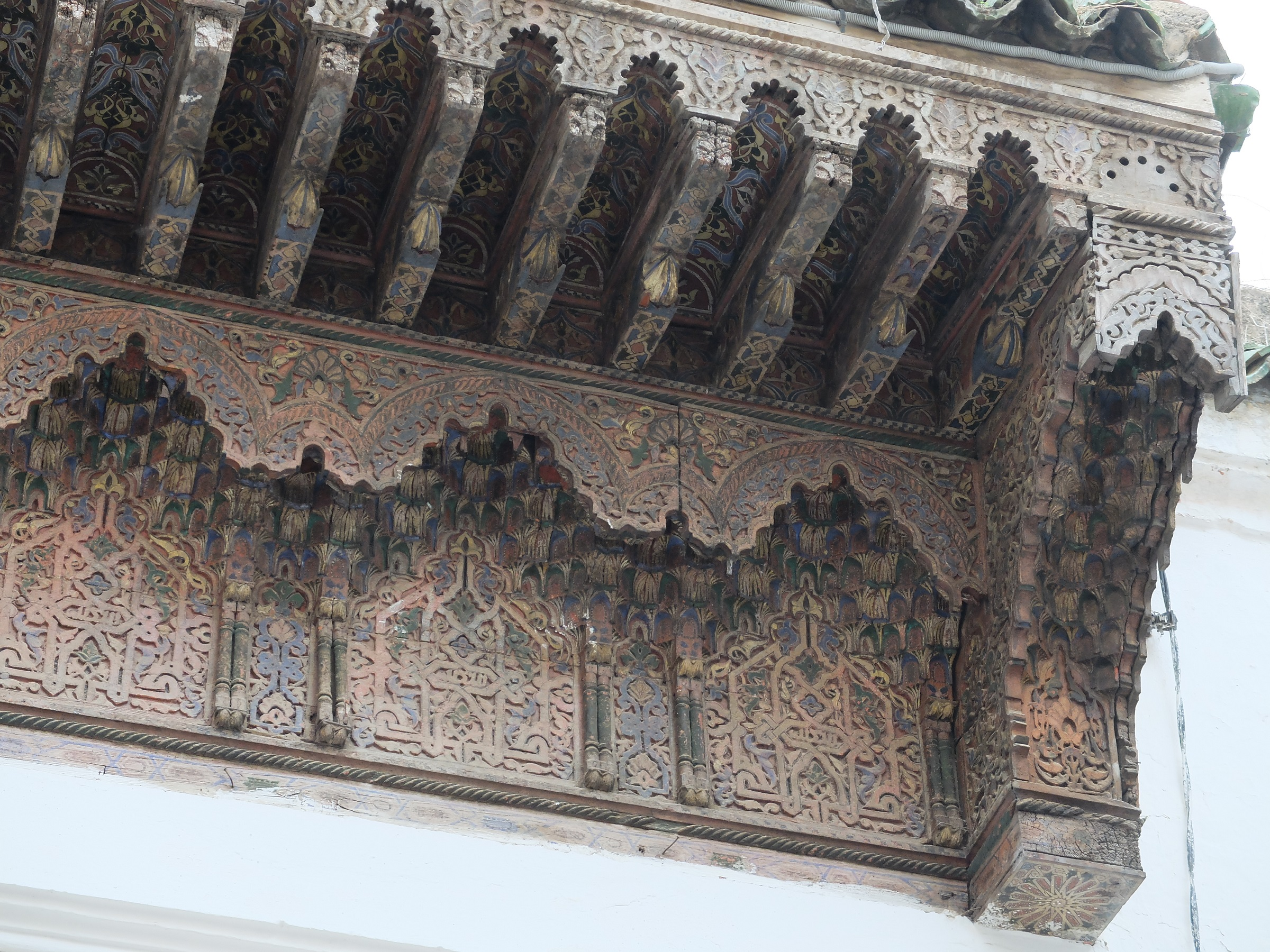
Detail of the wooden canopy above the entrance

== See also ==
- List of mosques in Morocco
