= El-Oued Mosque =

Mosque in Fez, Morocco

- Arabic: جامع الواد; Berber languages: ⵎⴻⵣⴳⵉⴷⴰ ⵏ ⵊⴰⵎⵄⵍⵡⴰⴷ
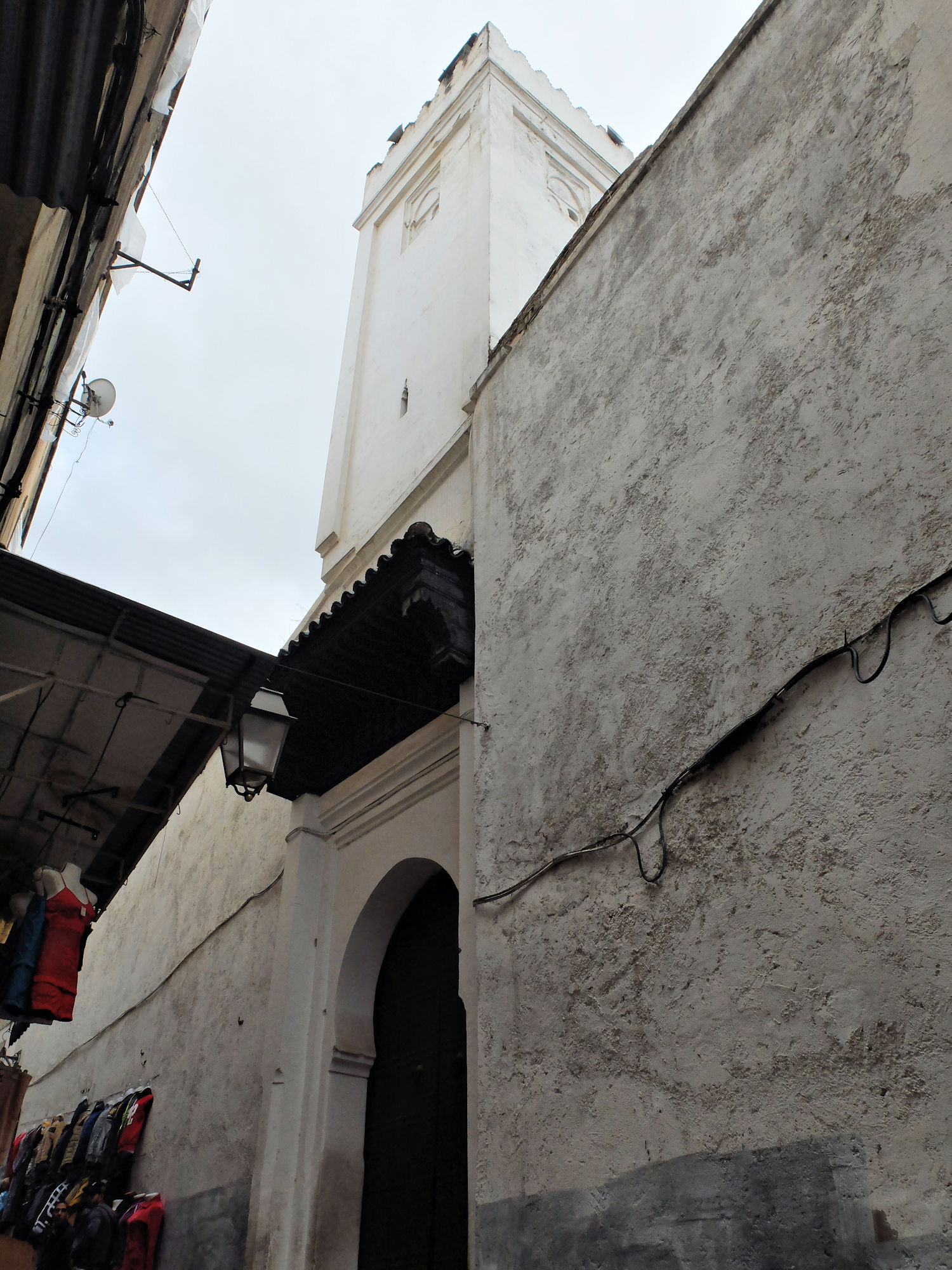
- Entrance and minaret (2014 photo)

Religion
- Affiliation: Sunni Islam

Location
- Location: Fez, Morocco
- Interactive map of El-Oued Mosque
- Coordinates: 34°03′45.6″N 4°58′9.7″W

Architecture
- Type: Mosque
- Style: Moorish (Moroccan)
- Founder: Abu Sa'id Uthman II (as madrasa); Moulay Slimane (as mosque)
- Established: 1323 CE (as madrasa); Between 1792 and 1822 (as mosque)
- Minaret: 1

The El-Oued Mosque (Arabic: جامع الواد, romanized: jama' al-wad, lit. 'mosque of the river'; Berber languages: ⵎⴻⵣⴳⵉⴷⴰ ⵏ ⵊⴰⵎⵄⵍⵡⴰⴷ) is a mosque in Fes el-Bali, the historic medina of Fez, Morocco. It was built in the late 18th or early 19th century on the site of a former 14th-century madrasa by the same name.

== History ==
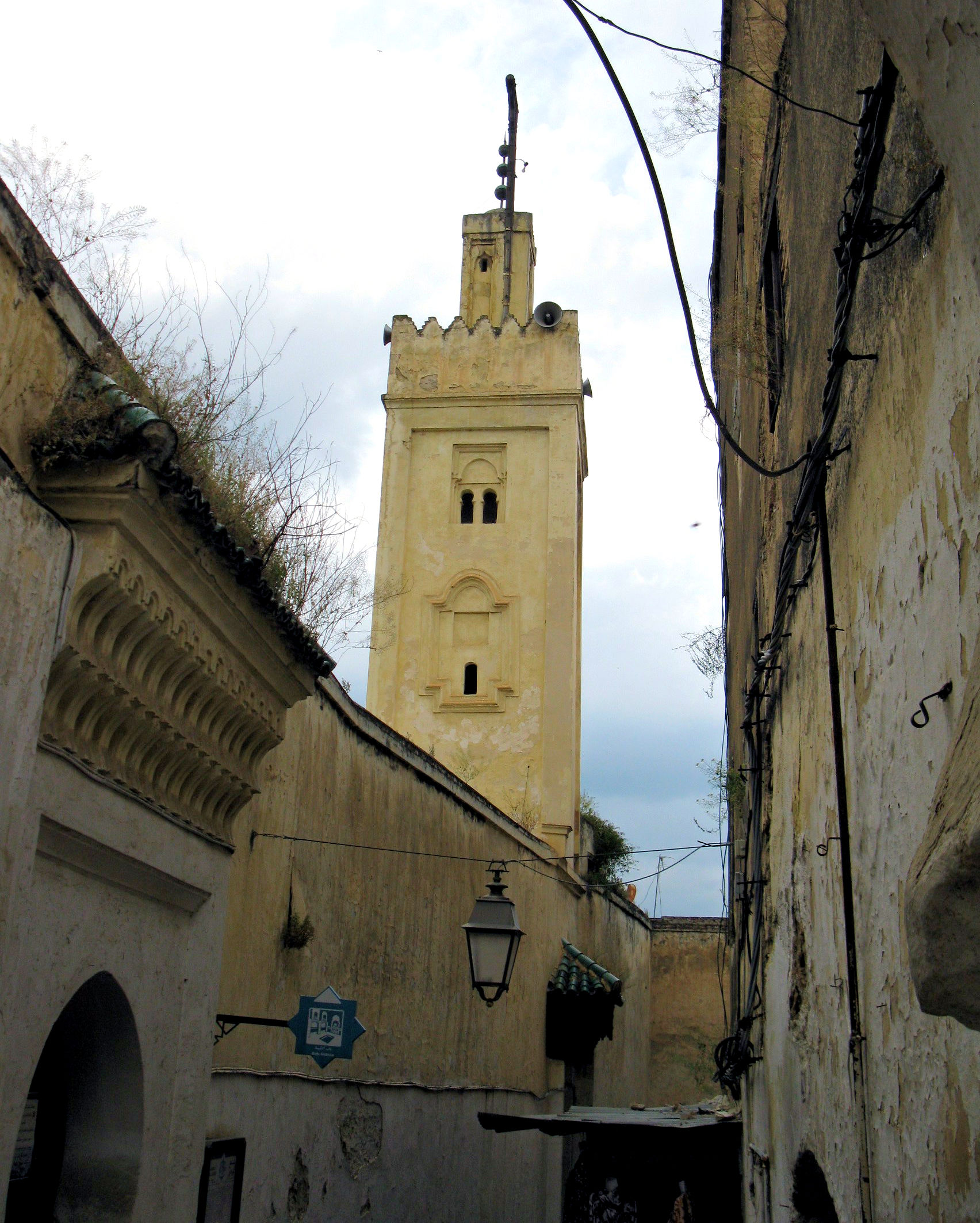
The southern facade of the minaret (2010 photo)

The mosque is located on the site of the former Madrasa el-Oued or (Madrasa al-Wadi), a madrasa built in 1321 or 1323 by the Marinid sultan Abu Sa'id Uthman II. The madrasa's name ("Mosque of the River") referred to the fact that it was located on top of the Oued Masmouda, a water canal branching off the Oued Fes river system which historically supplied water to much of the Andalus quarter of Fes el-Bali. (The canal has since been covered over for decades.) Along with the Madrasa as-Sahrij and the Madrasa as-Sba'iyyin, it was built to provide lodging and teaching for students studying at the nearby Andalus Mosque, much as the Seffarine and al-Attarine Madrasas served students at the al-Qarawiyyin Mosque across the river. Although the Andalus mosque was thus a major center of scholarship and study in the middle ages, it was eventually eclipsed by the Qarawiyyin Mosque/University and fell into relative decline, possibly making the madrasas less important. In the late 18th or early 19th century the Alawi sultan Moulay Slimane (who also built a number of other mosques in Fes) demolished the madrasa and built a new mosque over it, which became one of the main Friday mosques of the district.

== Architecture ==
The mosque follows the standard model of Moroccan mosque architecture. It has a prominent square-shaft minaret with minor decorative framing around its windows. The mosque's layout is distinguished by a proportionally very large rectangular courtyard (sahn), partly filled with fruit trees.

== See also ==
- Lists of mosques
- List of mosques in Africa
- List of mosques in Morocco
