= Riwaq (arcade) =

Islamic architectural feature

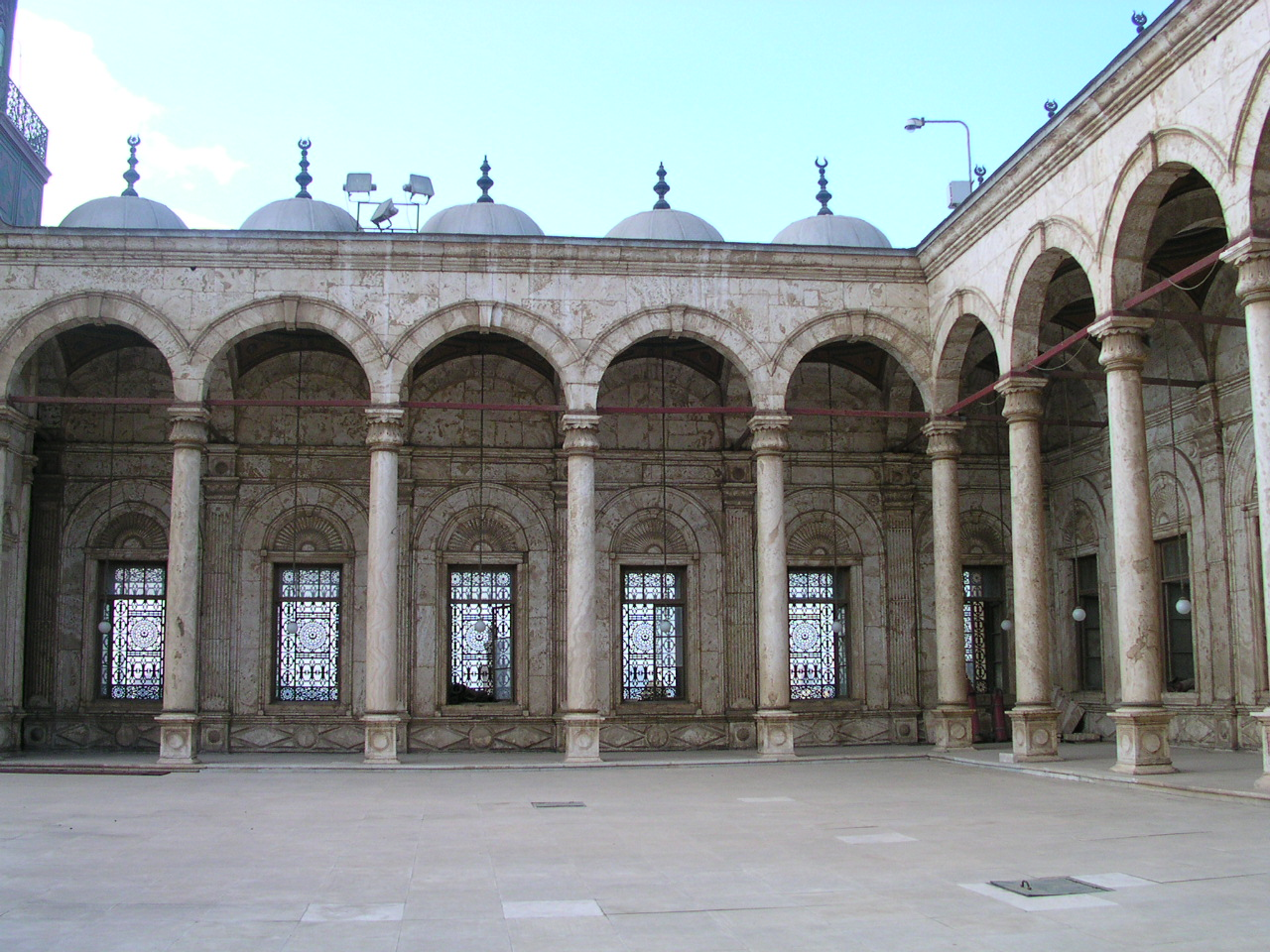
Riwaq at the Mosque of Muhammad Ali in Cairo

A riwaq (or rivaq, Arabic: رواق riwāq or ruwāq) is an arcade or portico (if in front of entrances) open on at least one side. It is an architectural design element in Islamic architecture and Islamic garden design.

A riwaq often serves as the transition space between interior and outdoor spaces. As portico or arcade structure, it provides shade and adjustment to sunlight in hot climates, and cover from rain in any locale.

== Arcade ==
As an arcade element the structure is often found surrounding and defining the courtyards (sahn) of mosques and madrasas, and used for covered circulation, meeting and rest, and ritual circumambulation. The arcade element is also found along principal walkways of larger bazaars.

=== Examples ===
Riwaq arcade examples include:

- The Saudi Riwaq—a portico expansion at the Masjid al-Haram mosque in Makkah
- Along the main avenues of the Bazaar of Kashan, in present-day Iran.

== See also ==
- Index: Islamic architectural elements
