= Abu al-Hasan Mosque =

Mosque in Fes, Morocco

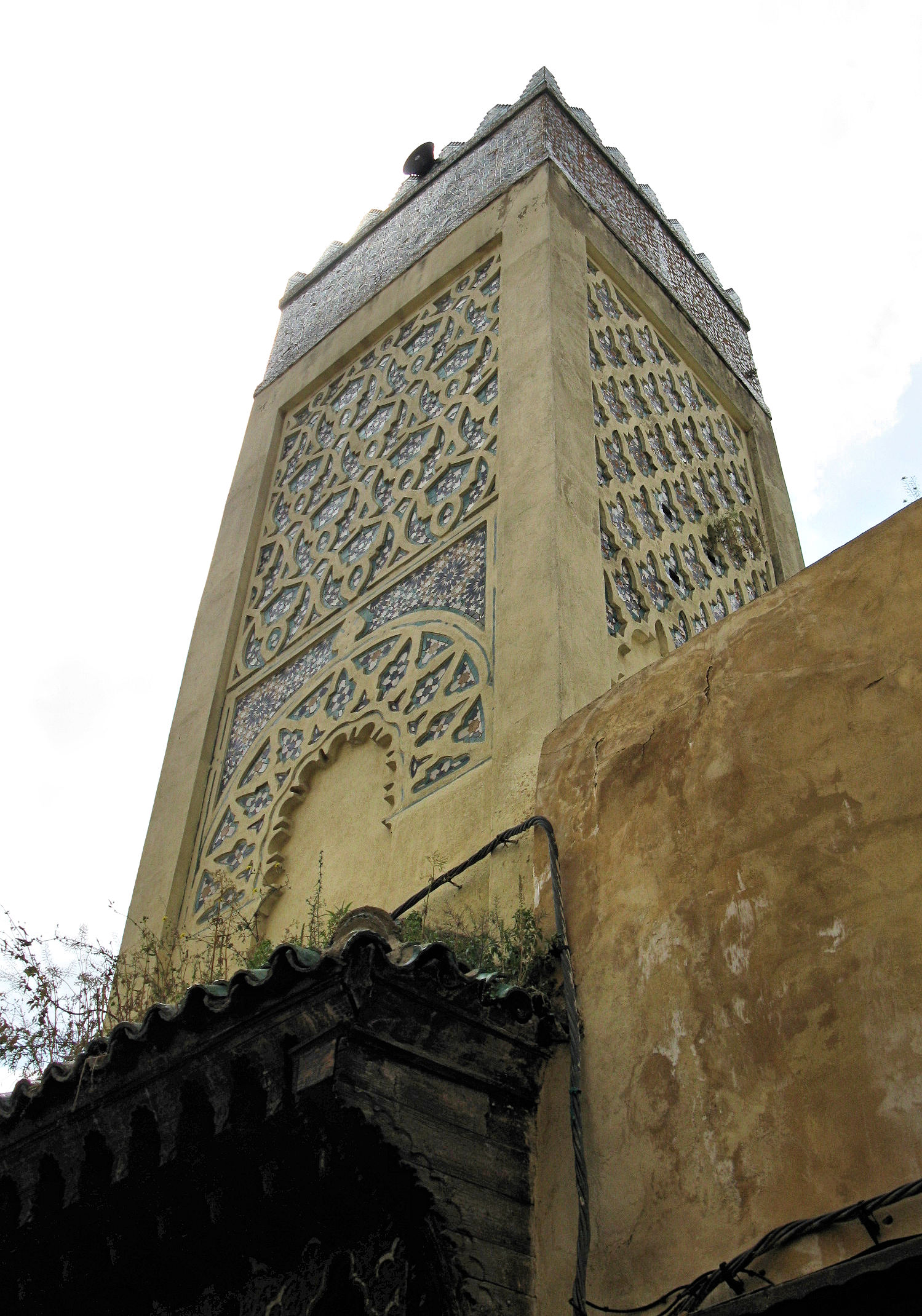
- The minaret, as seen from Tala'a Sghira street

Religion
- Affiliation: Sunni Islam
- Status: active

Location
- Location: Fez, Morocco
- Interactive map of Abu al-Hasan Mosque
- Coordinates: 34°03′43.2″N 4°58′56.2″W

Architecture
- Type: mosque
- Style: Moorish (Marinid, Alawi)
- Founder: Abu al-Hassan
- Established: 1341 CE

Specifications
- Length: 10.35 metres
- Width: 17 metres
- Minaret: 1
- Minaret height: (approx.) 18.85 metres

The Mosque of Abu al-Hasan is a historic neighbourhood mosque in Fes el-Bali, the old medina of Fez, Morocco. It is located on Tala'a Seghira street, near the Bou Inania Madrasa.

== History ==
The mosque was built in 1341 by the Marinid sultan Abu al-Hasan, as recorded by a foundation inscription carved on a marble plaque inside. It was renovated by the Alawi sultan Moulay Slimane during his reign between 1792 and 1822. It bears many resemblances to the Sharabliyyin Mosque to the east, which was founded and also later renovated at around the same times.

== Architecture ==
=== General layout and interior ===
The mosque is a generally rectangular building 17 meters wide and 10.35 meters deep. The mosque's street facade is marked by a doorway in the shape of a horseshoe arch, which is overshadowed by an ornately carved wooden canopy.

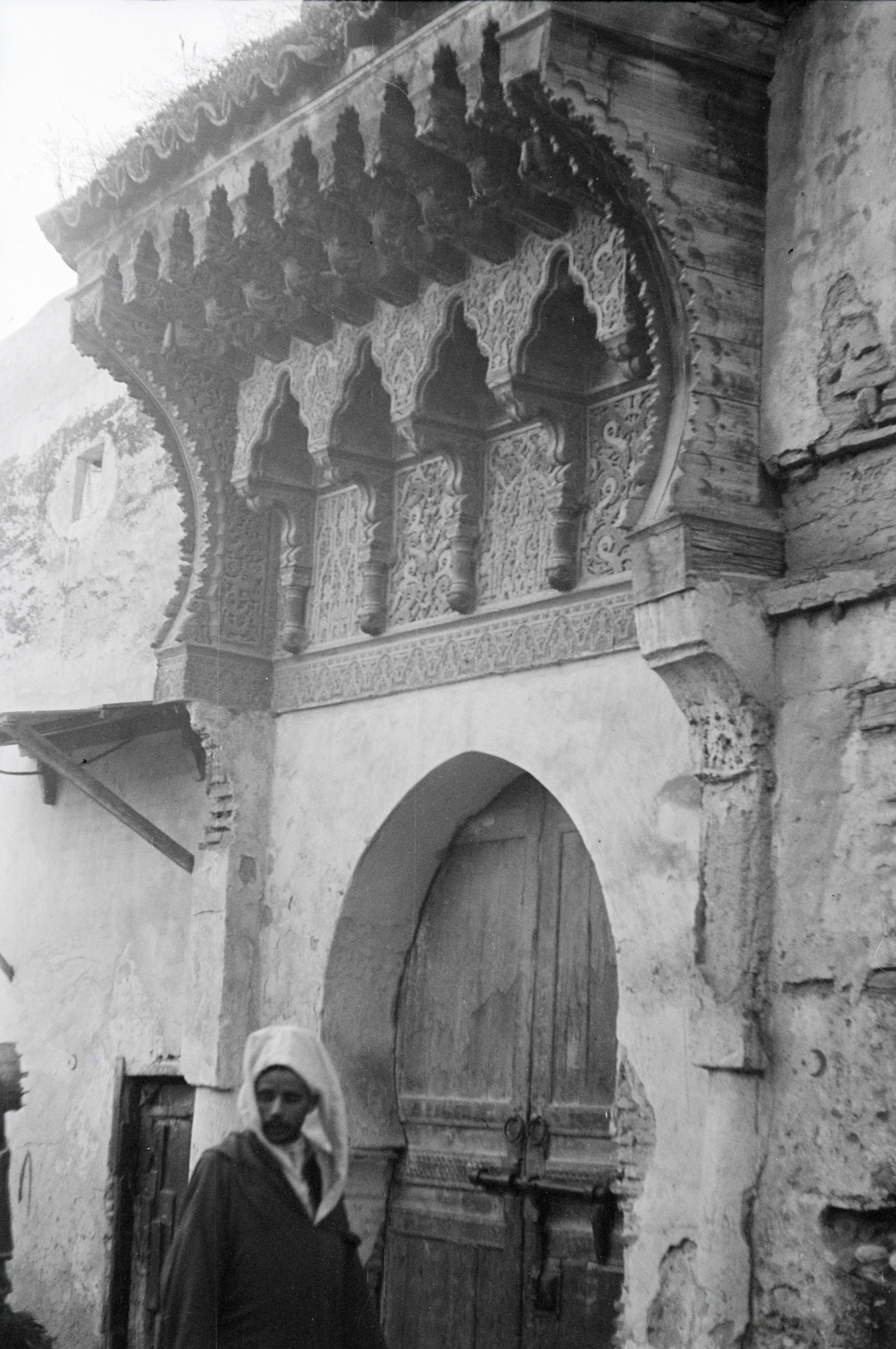
The entrance of the mosque, pictured in 1932

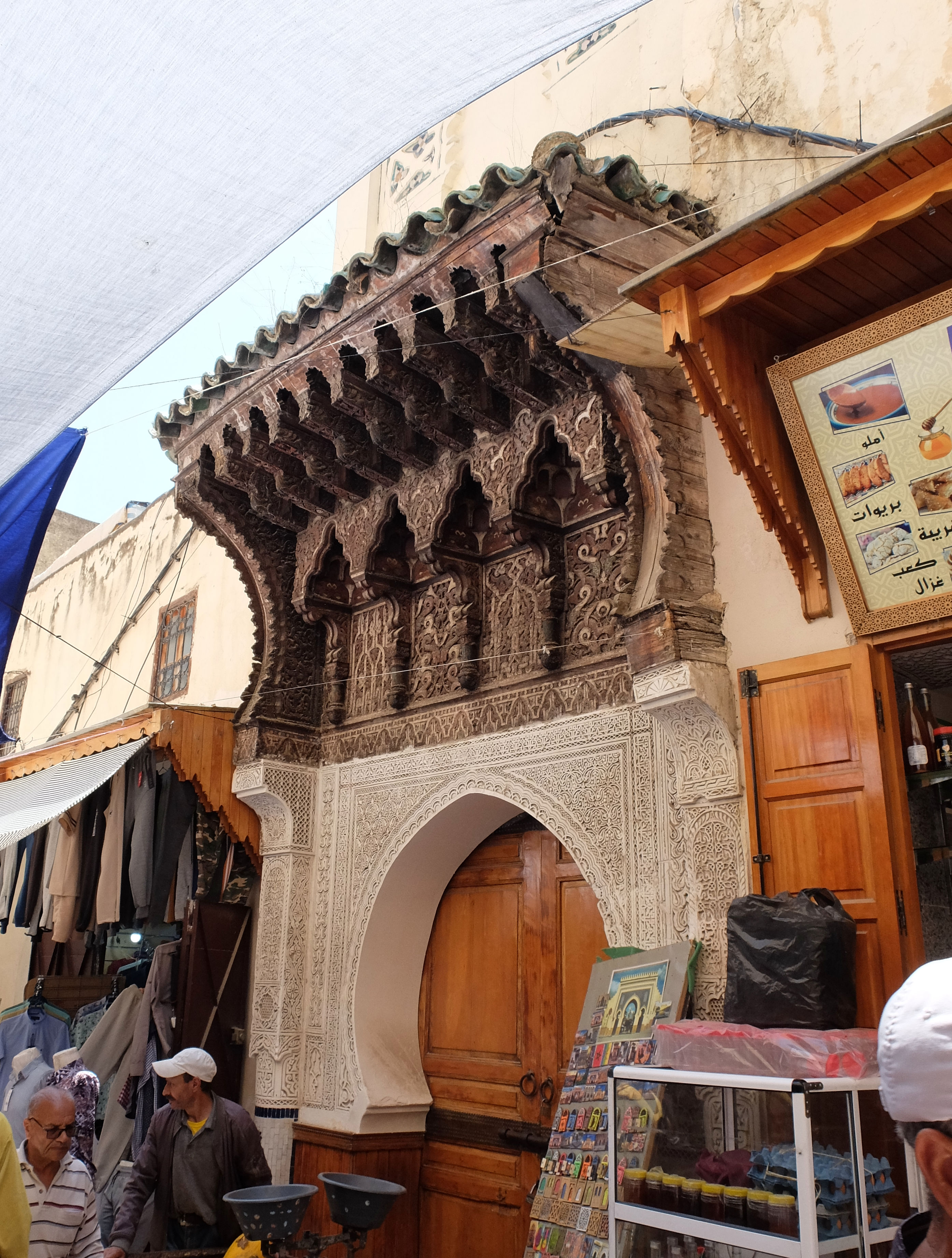
The entrance of the mosque today (2023 photo)

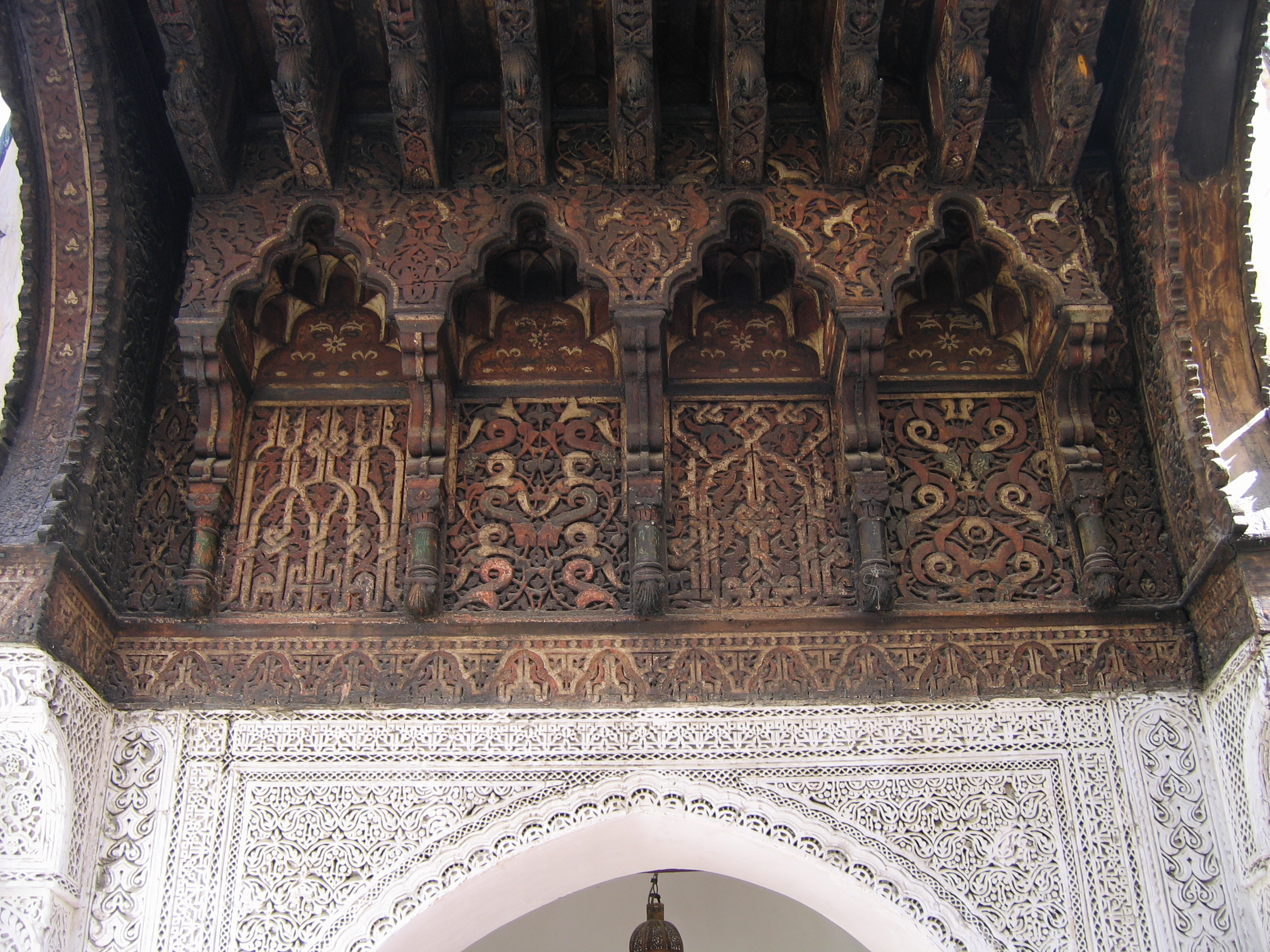
Details of the wood-carved canopy above the entrance

The interior layout of the mosque features a small square courtyard (sahn) flanked by galleries on two sides and by the main prayer hall to the south. Somewhat unusually, the prayer hall is composed of only one transverse "nave" running along the full width of the building instead of being split by multiple rows of arches. The prayer hall is covered by a sloped timber roof and a wooden ceiling with painted decoration. The mihrab consists of a niche opening through a horseshoe arch in the middle of the southern wall and surrounded by carved stucco decoration consisting of Arabic epigraphy, geometric motifs, and arabesques. The mihrab was significantly restored or remade during the restorations by Moulay Slimane (1792-1823). Its form is very similar to that of the Sharabliyyin Mosque, which was also founded around the same time and was also renovated by Moulay Slimane.

The mosque also features another courtyard on its east side, centered on a water basin decorated with zellij (mosaic tilework) and surrounded by small latrine rooms. This section served as a facility for performing ablutions. This ablutions section is connected to the mosque by a passage off the main courtyard and also has its own street entrance to the east of the mosque's main entrance.

=== Minaret ===
The mosque's minaret, which rises above the main entrance on Tala'a Seghira, has a typical Moroccan form with a square shaft. The main shaft has a height of 15.65 meters and a width of 3.1 meters, and is topped by a smaller secondary square shaft which is 3 meters tall and 1.2 meters wide. The minaret's east and west facades are decorated with a sebka motif. Its southern and northern facades (including the street-facing side) are covered in a different interlacing pattern that occupies most of a radiating arch motif at the base. The empty spaces within the motifs of each facade are filled with zellij tilework, and a large band of zellij also runs near the top of the minaret's shaft. While the wide motifs of the minaret date from the Marinid period, the zellij tilework within these motifs may have been added around the late 18th or early 19th century during the renovations by Moulay Slimane. The band of zellij at the top, however, is likely still part of the Marinid design. The minaret's design bears many resemblances with the Chrabliyine Mosque which was built around the same time. However, the interlacing motif on its northern and southern sides distinguishes itself for its greater originality.

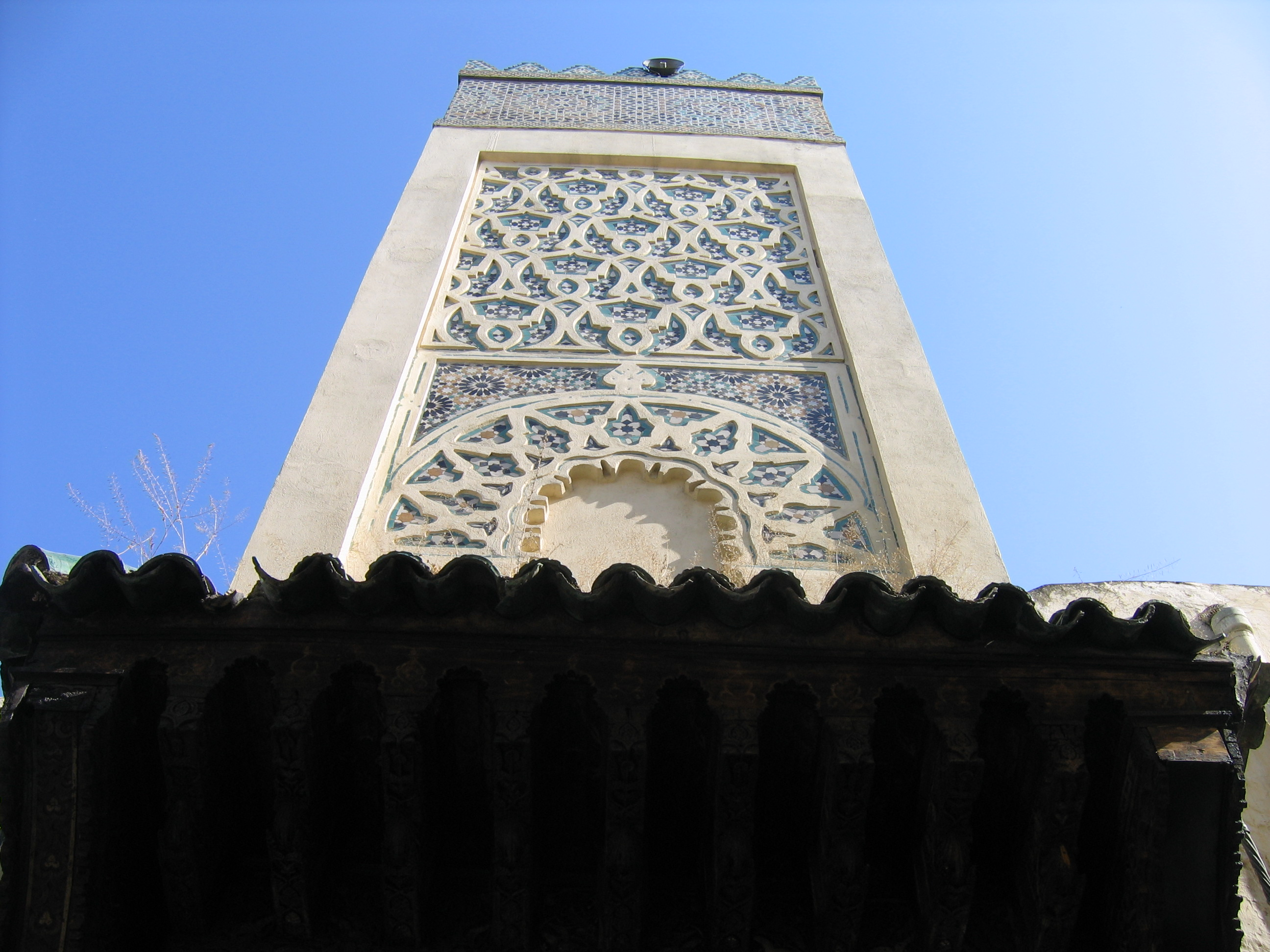
The northern facade of the minaret (facing the street)

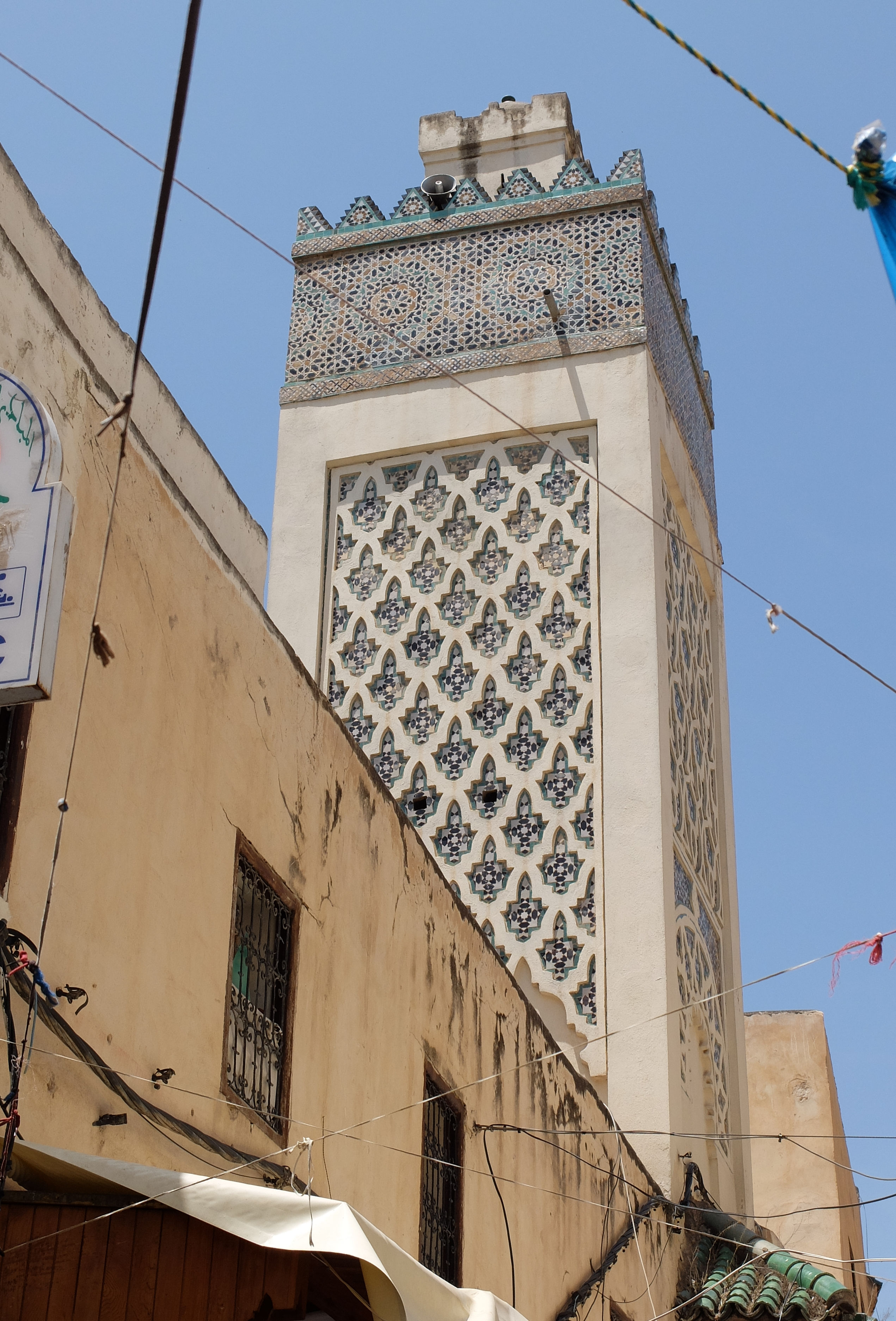
The eastern facade of the minaret, seen from the street

== See also ==
- List of mosques in Morocco
