= Sharabliyyin Mosque =

Mosque in Fez, Morocco

- جامع الشرابليين
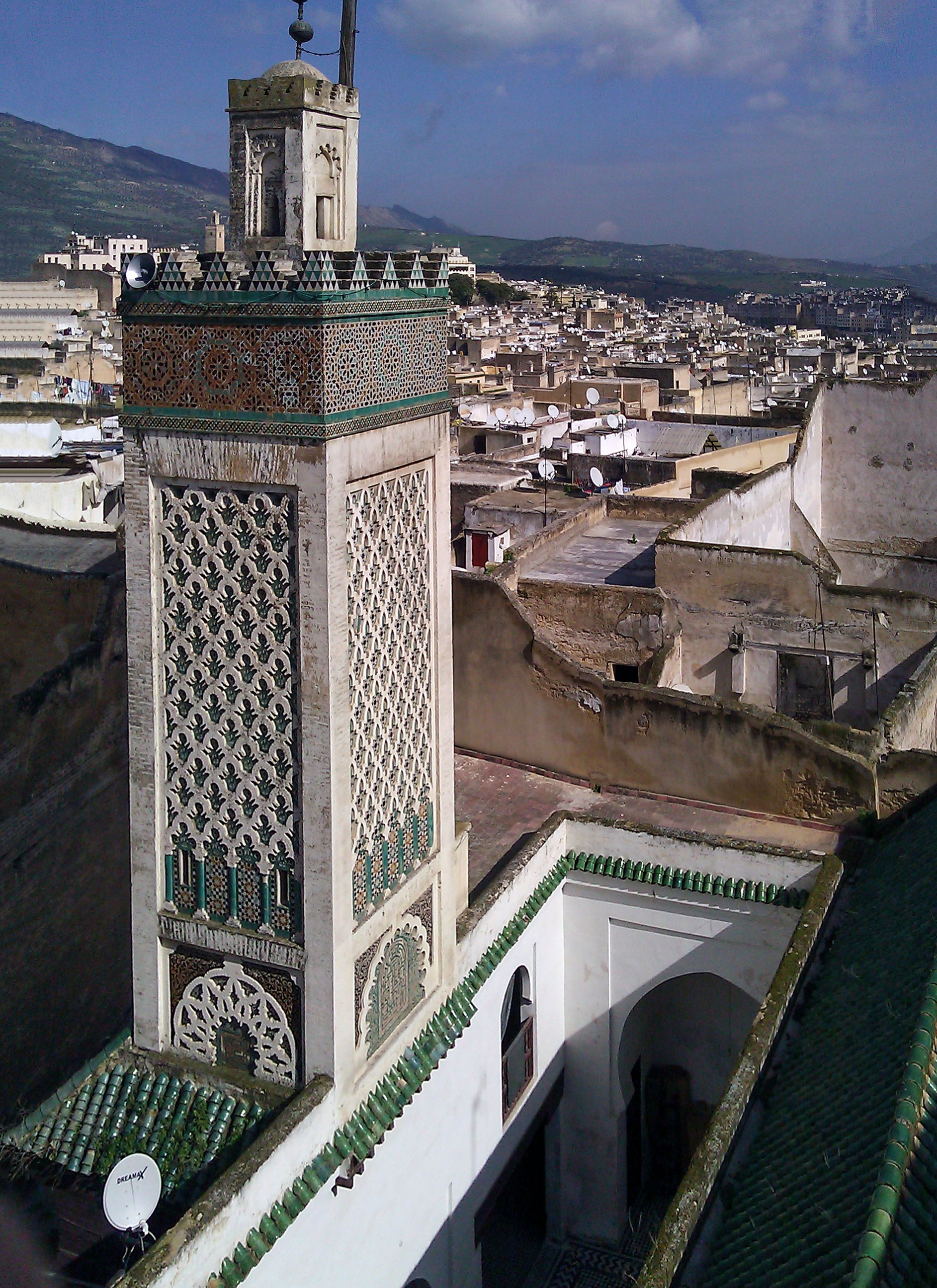
- View of the mosque's minaret and courtyard

Religion
- Affiliation: Sunni Islam
- Status: active

Location
- Location: Fez, Morocco
- Interactive map of Sharabliyyin Mosque
- Coordinates: 34°03′53.5″N 4°58′40.1″W

Architecture
- Type: Mosque
- Style: Moorish (Marinid, Alawi)
- Founder: Abu al-Hasan Ali ibn Othman
- Completed: between 1331 and 1348
- Minaret: 1

The Sharabliyyin Mosque (Note: The name is also variably transliterated as Sherabliyyin Mosque, Sharabliyin Mosque, Cherabliyin Mosque, Chrabliyin Mosque, etc.) (Arabic: جامع الشرابليين, romanized: jāma' ash-sharābliyyīn) is a historic mosque in Fez, Morocco. It was first built in the 14th century during the Marinid dynasty period and underwent a major restoration in the late 19th or early 20th century during the Alawi period. It has the typical architectural features of a historic local mosque, such as a courtyard, a covered prayer hall, a funerary space, and an ablutions facility. It is notable for its decorated minaret, which overlooks Tala'a Kebira street in the old quarter of Fes el Bali.

== History ==
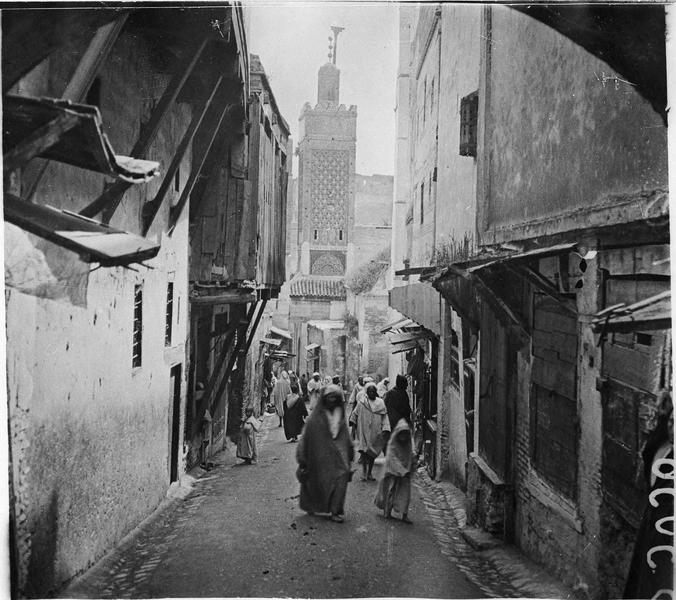
View of the mosque's minaret down Tala'a Kebira in 1916

The mosque was founded in the 14th century during the Marinid period. Although the exact date and patron of its construction are not confirmed, it is believed to have been built by the Marinid sultan Abu al-Hasan during his reign between 1331 and 1348 CE. Abu al-Hasan was one of the most prolific builders of the Marinid era, and was responsible for building several madrasas and mosques in Fes and beyond.

The mosque was considerably restored under the reign of the Alawi sultan Moulay Slimane between 1792 and 1822. Only the minaret and the mosque entrance are still essentially in their original Marinid form, while the appearance of the rest of the mosque generally dates from the Alaouite restoration. The Mosque of Abu al-Hasan to the west, built by the same ruler in 1341 and similarly renovated by Moulay Slimane, bears a number of resemblances with this building.

== Location and name ==
The mosque is located on Tala'a Kebira, the main souq (market) street and artery of Fes el-Bali, the old city of Fez, from which its minaret is prominently visible. The surrounding district is also referred to as Sharabliyyin (or Chrabliyine), a name which refers to a type of traditional Moroccan women's shoe (called "cherbil") in which the local shops specialized (and still do to some extent today).

== Architecture ==
=== Minaret and exterior ===
The mosque is notable for its minaret, which is richly decorated in the medieval Moroccan-Andalusi style (evolved from earlier Almohad models). It makes use of the darj-w-ktaf or sebka pattern (resembling palmettes or fleur-de-lys shapes) covering much of the façades, as well as polylobed arch motifs near the base, merlons at the top, and multicolored mosaic tiles (zellij) that fill the empty spaces. One of these tile mosaics, on the side of the minaret overlooking the interior courtyard, features an inscription in the Square Kufic style. The colourful mosaic tilework of the minaret was likely added in the reign of Moulay Slimane (r. 1792–1822), although the wide band of zellij at the top is most likely part of the original Marinid design.

The main street entrance to the mosque is directly below the minaret and is overlooked by a canopy of carved wood. The street facade of the building also includes spaces for two shops.

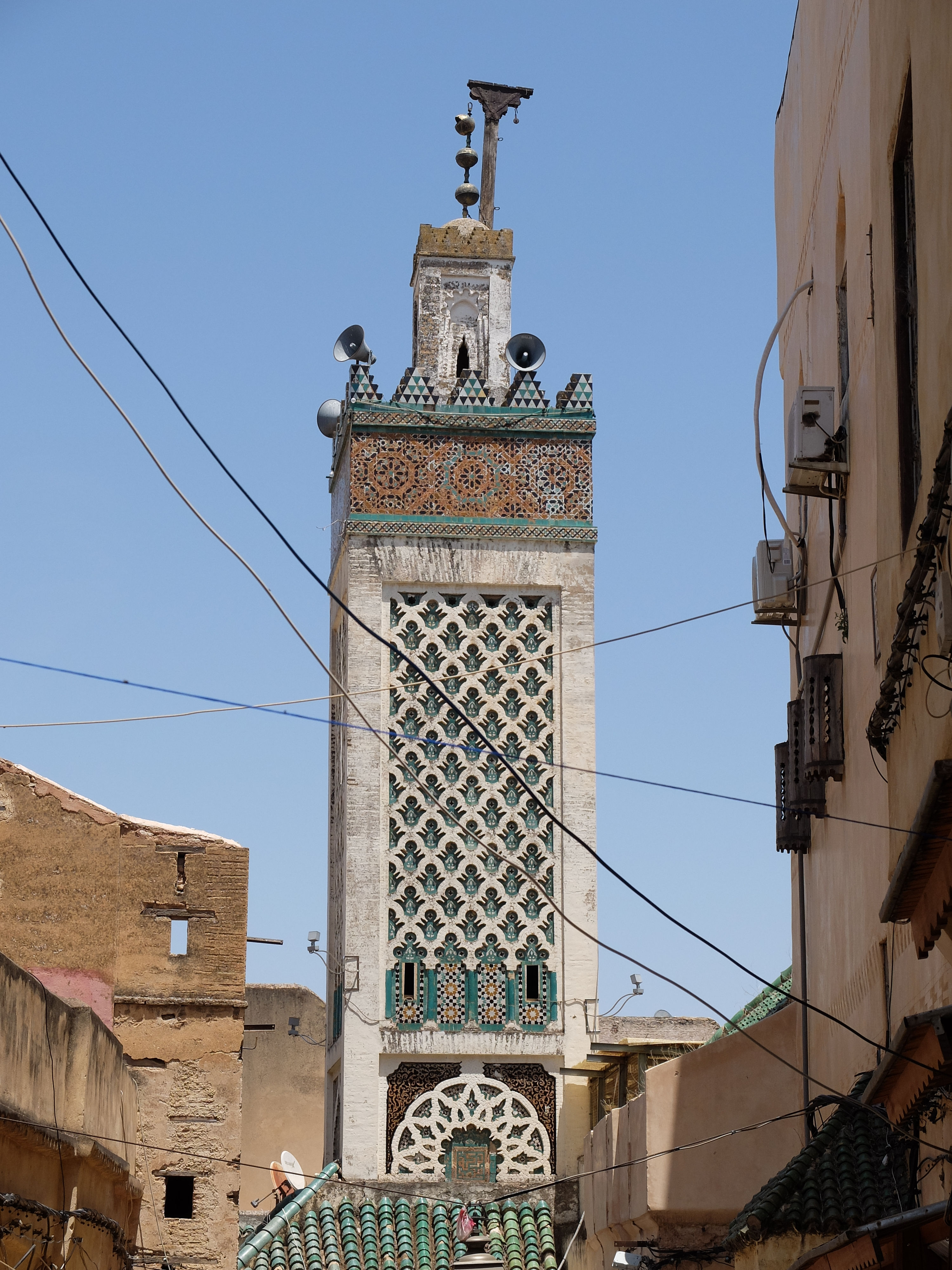
View of the minaret from the west

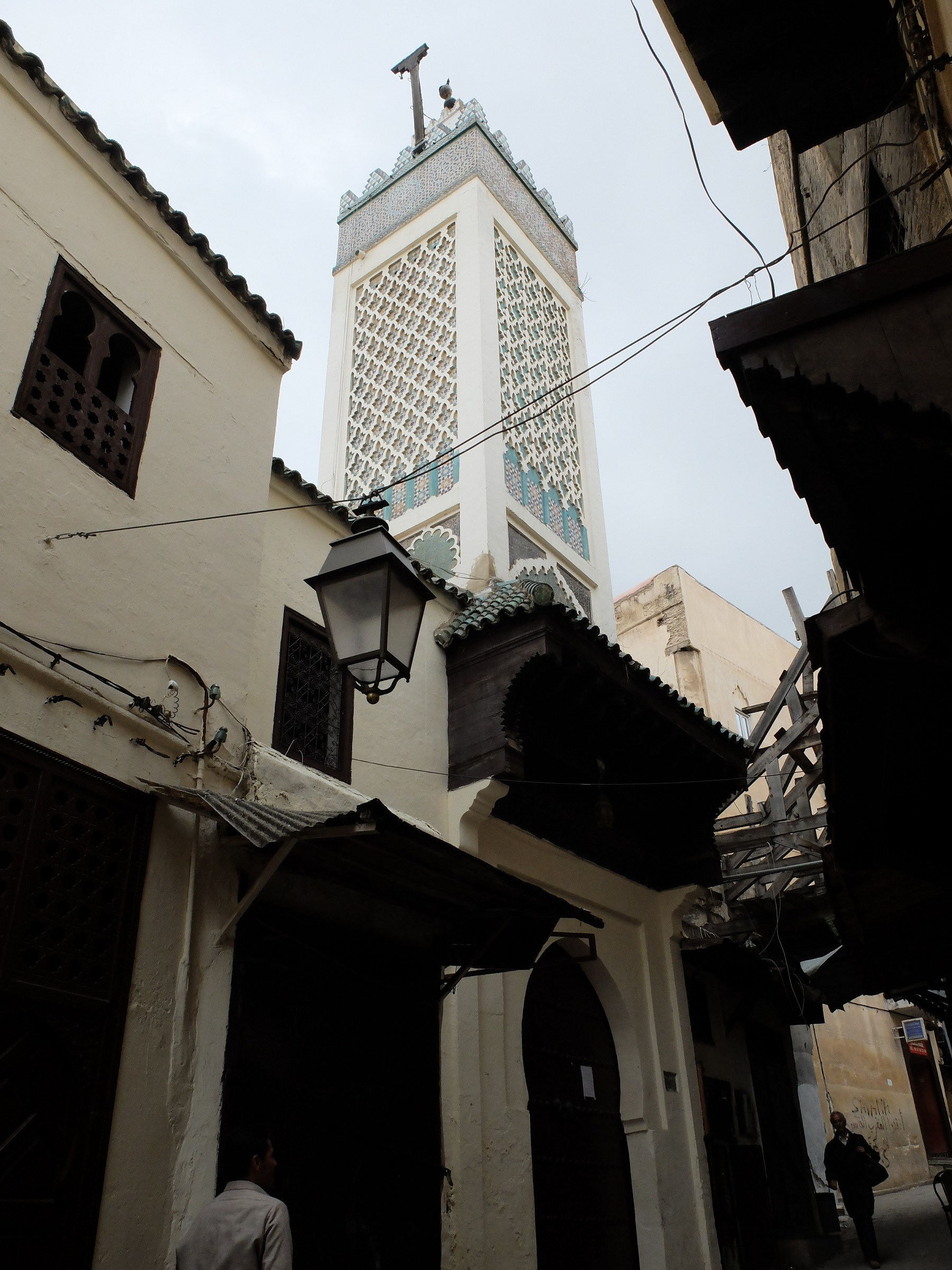
The main entrance of the mosque on Tala'a Kebira street

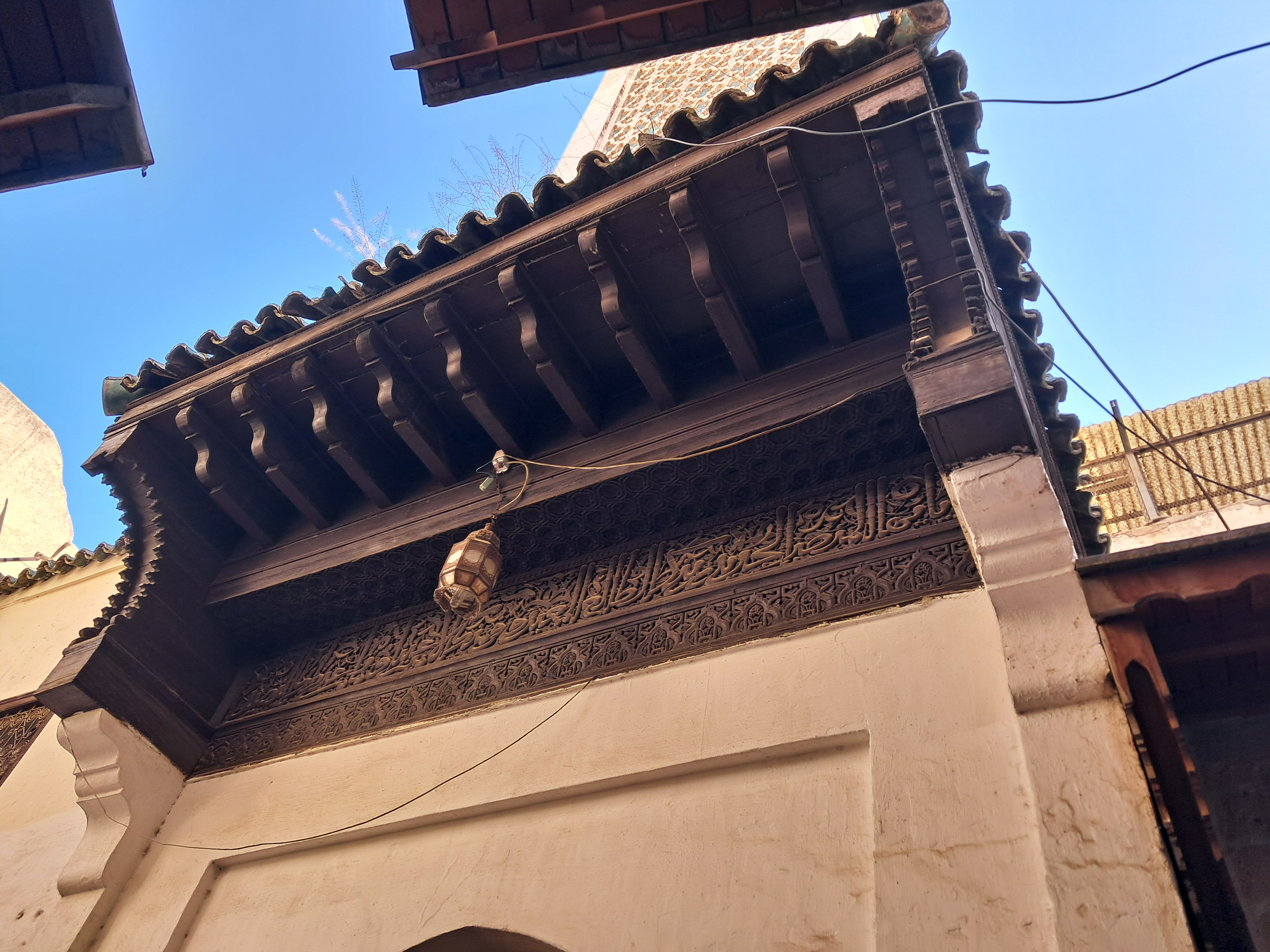
The wooden canopy above the street entrance

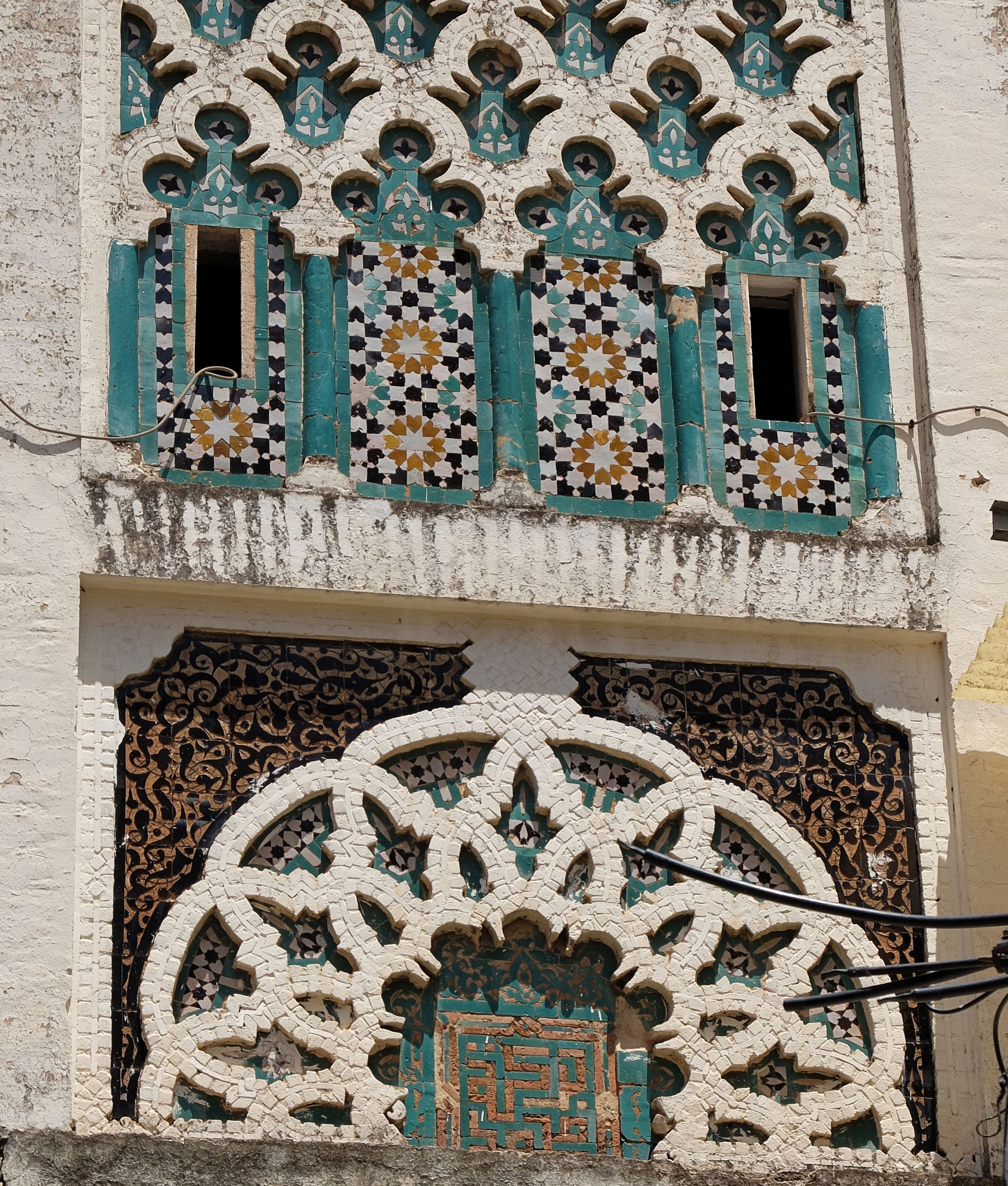
Details of the brick and zellij decoration on the lower part of the minaret

=== Interior ===
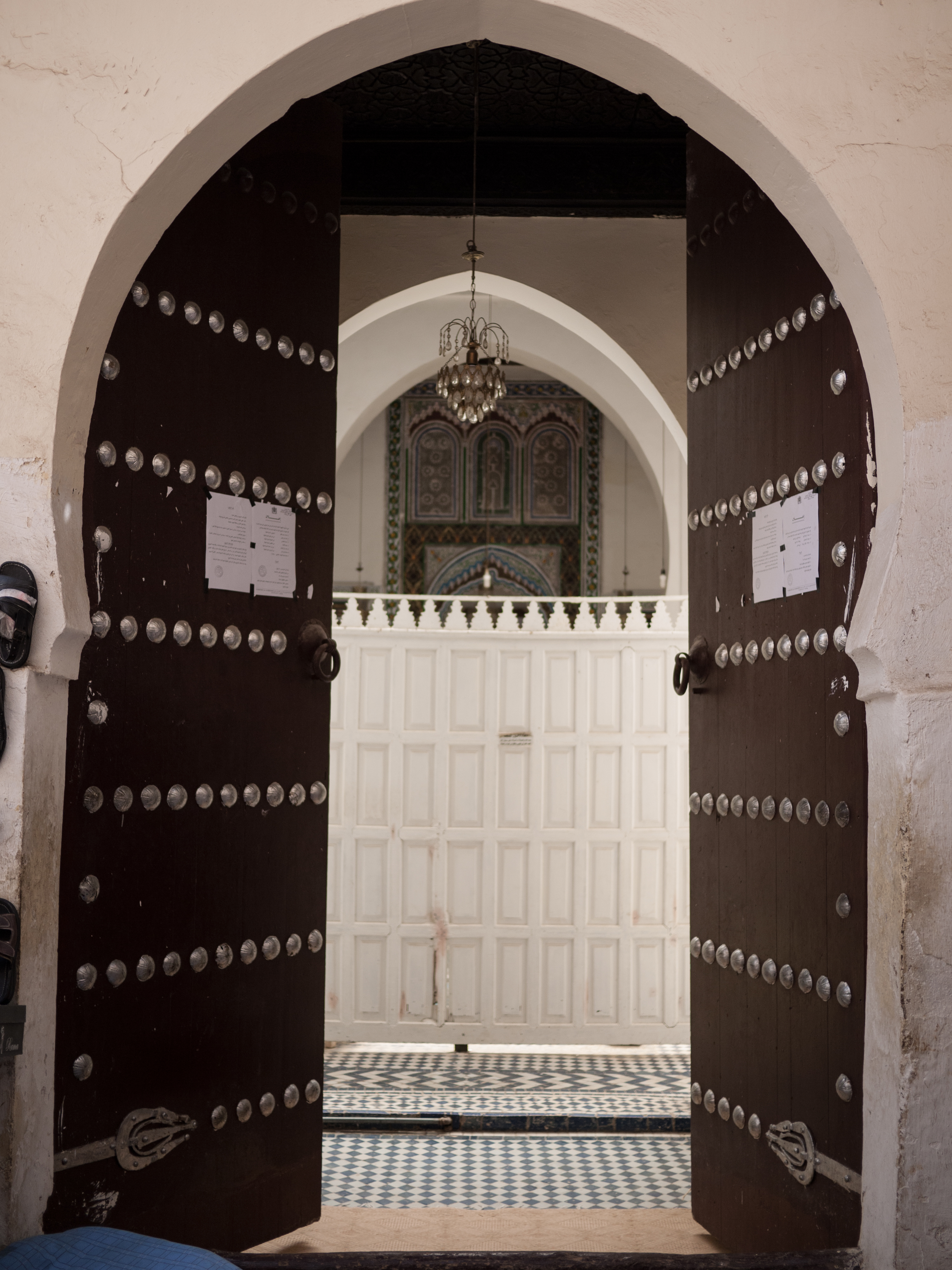
Glimpse of the mosque's interior from the main entrance, looking towards the mihrab

The interior of the mosque features a rectangular courtyard, roughly 11 by 5 metres (36 by 16 ft), that can be accessed directly from the street entrance and which is flanked on either side by annexes. The courtyard, like that of many mosques, features a marble fountain in its center, while on its northwestern side is an entrance to an ablution room. On its southeastern side is the prayer hall, featuring two transverse naves formed by rows of five horseshoe arches parallel to the qibla wall (the wall in the direction of prayer). The mihrab, a decorative alcove or niche that symbolizes the qibla, is a small octagonal space topped by a dome of muqarnas. On either side of the mihrab are two small doors leading to other rooms. The eastern one (on the left) connects to a "mosque of the dead" or funerary mosque (Jama' el-Gnaiz), a space used for funerary rites and prayers around the bodies of the deceased before they are buried. This space is attached to but separate from the rest of the mosque in order to protect the cleanliness and sanctity of the main prayer space. Both this funerary space and the main prayer hall can also be accessed by smaller secondary entrances from the street on the eastern side of the building.

=== Ablutions facility ===
Directly across the street from the mosque is a mida'a (Arabic: ميضأة), a facility that allowed Muslims to perform ablutions. The facility consists of an internal courtyard which was reached through a bent corridor from the street entrance. At the middle of the courtyard is a rectangular water basin, decorated with simple tilework, while around the courtyard are multiple small rooms which contain latrines.

== See also ==
- Lists of mosques
- List of mosques in Africa
- List of mosques in Morocco
