= Moulay Slimane Mosque =

Mosque in Rabat, Morocco

- مسجد مولاي سليمان
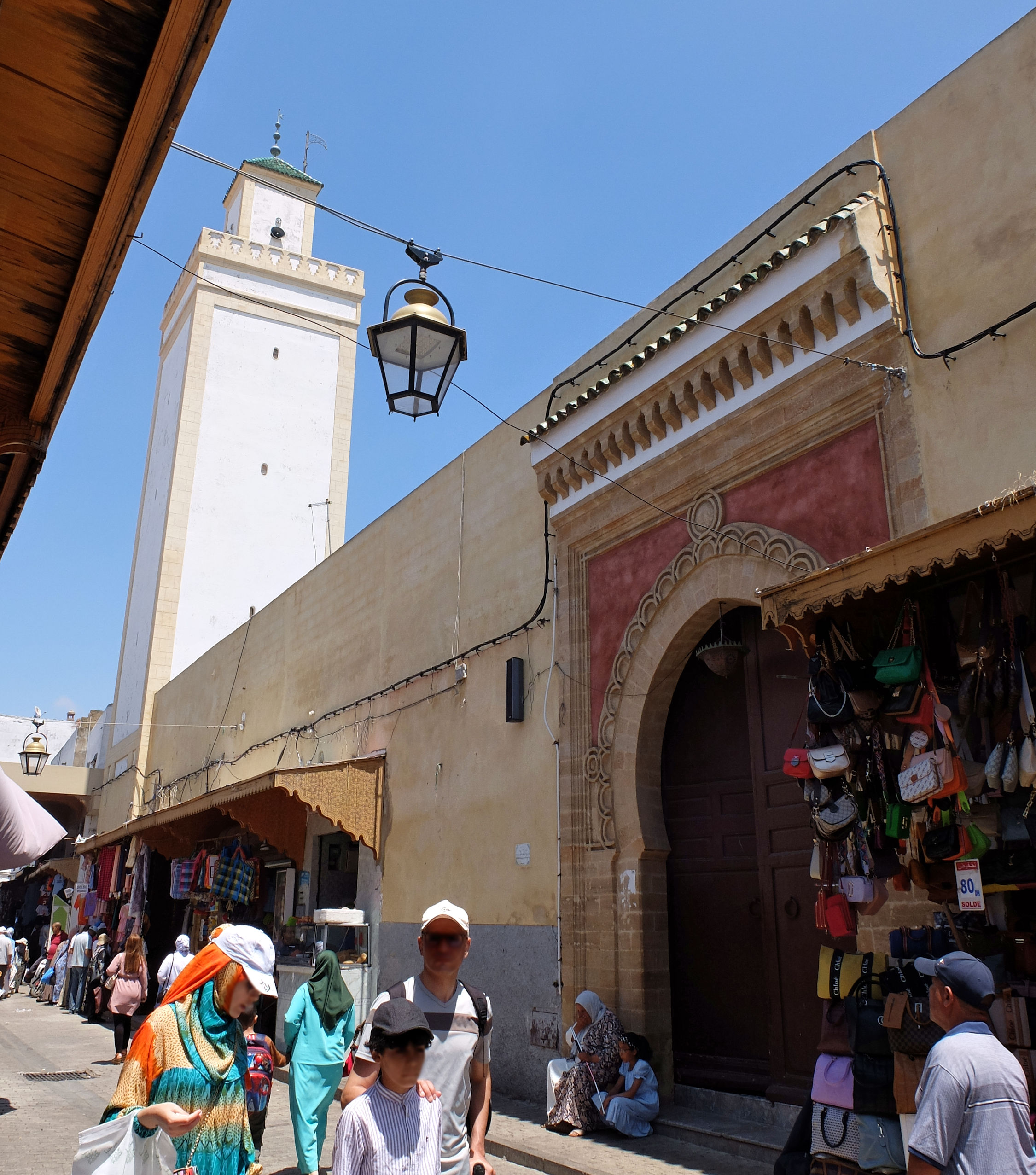

- Location within Morocco

Religion
- Affiliation: Islam

Location
- Municipality: Rabat
- Country: Morocco
- Coordinates: 34°1′24.4″N 6°50′14.4″W

Architecture
- Type: mosque
- Creator: Slimane of Morocco
- Established: 1812

The Moulay Slimane Mosque (Arabic: مسجد مولاي سليمان) is a mosque in the medina of Rabat, Morocco. It was built in 1812 by the 'Alawi sultan Moulay Slimane, after whom it is named. It is the second-largest mosque of the medina north of the Andalusian wall (along Avenue Hassan II), located at the intersection of Souika Street and Sidi Fateh Street, close to the Bab Bouiba gate. The mosque occupies a surface area of 1000 square metres and its minaret is 32 meters high. It has a traditional layout for a Moroccan mosque, with a courtyard (sahn) and an interior hypostyle prayer hall.

== See also ==
- List of mosques in Morocco
