= List of mosques in Morocco =

This is a list of mosques in Morocco. According to the Ministry of Awqaf and Islamic Affairs in 2016, there are around 41,755 mosques in Morocco, of which 16,489 are congregational mosques, and 10,061 are specifically designated as culturally significant.

Name	Images	Location	Year	Remarks
Abu al-Hasan Mosque		Fez	1341	
Al-Aadam Mosque ‘Masjid Al aadam'		Safi	12th - 13th century	
Ahl Fas Mosque		Rabat	18th century	
Al-Akhawayn University Mosque		Ifrane	1995	
Cheikh Al Kamel Mausoleum		Meknes	1776	Preserves the tomb of Mohammed al-Hadi ben Issa, a Sufi mystic and Ash'ari scholar.
Al-Beida Mosque		Fez	N/A	
Al-Fath Mosque		Kenitra	N/A	
Al-Kawtar Mosque		Kenitra	N/A	
Al-Khayr Mosque		Agadir	N/A	
Al-Rahmah Mosque		Fez	N/A	
Al-Souriyin Mosque		Tangier	1975	
Al-Wusta Mosque		Marrakesh	1538	Built by a Saadian vizier named 'Allish (or 'Alilsh) in 1538, later rebuilt or modified under Sultan Moulay Abd ar-Rahman in the 19th century.
Ad-Doha Mosque		Casablanca	N/A	
Andalusian Mosque		Fez	860	
Grande Mosque (Larache)		Larache	1689	
Assunna Mosque		Casablanca	1966	Mosque designed by Jean-François Zevaco in a modernist brutalist style.
As-Sunna Mosque		Kenitra	N/A	
As-Sunna Mosque		Rabat	1785	
Bab Berdieyinne Mosque		Meknes	18th century	
Bab Doukkala Mosque		Marrakesh	1570-71	
Bab Guissa Mosque		Fez	1760	
Barrima Mosque		Marrakesh	late 18th century	Mosque attached to the Royal Palace (Dar al-Makhzen) in Marrakesh.
Ben Salah Mosque		Marrakesh	14th century	
Ben Youssef Mosque		Marrakesh	1070s	Established by Almoravids but current building was completely rebuilt by Alaouite dynasty.
Ben Youssef Mosque		Essaouira	18th century	
Bou Inania Madrasa		Fez	1351-1356	Built as a madrasa but gained the status of Friday mosque.
Bou Jeloud Mosque		Fez	Between 1184 and 1199	Originally the mosque of the Kasbah Bou Jeloud (which no longer exists today).
Chellah Minaret		Rabat	13th century	
Chrabliyine Mosque		Fez	1342	
Dar El Makhzen Mosque		Casablanca	N/A	
Diwan Mosque		Fez	Between 1792 and 1822	
El-Oued Mosque		Fez	Between 1792 and 1822	Initially founded as a madrasa in 1323, later replaced by the current mosque.
Grand Mosque of Asilah		Asilah	Late 17th century	
Grand Mosque of Chefchaouen		Chefchaouen	1471 or 16th century	
Grand Mosque of Fes el-Jdid		Fez	1276	First mosque of Fes el-Jdid. Marinid sultan Abu Inan is believed to be buried here.
Grand Mosque of Meknes		Meknes	12th century.	
Grand Mosque of Tangier		Tangier	Current building dates from 1817–18; a mosque existed on the same site earlier.	
Grand Mosque of Oujda		Oujda	1296	
Great Mosque (Rabat)		Rabat	Late 13th or early 14th century	Founded by the Marinids but almost completely reconstructed in more recent periods. The current minaret dates from 1939.
Great Mosque of Salé		Salé	1028-1029	
Great Mosque of Taza		Taza	1142	
Hamra Mosque		Fez	14th century	
Hassan Tower		Rabat	1199	
Hassan II Mosque		Casablanca	1993	
Kasbah Mosque of Marrakech		Marrakesh	1185-1190	
Kasbah Mosque in Tangier		Tangier	Late 17th century (after 1684)	
Kasbah An-Nouar Mosque		Fez	18th century	Original date of construction is unknown.
Kutubiyya Mosque		Marrakesh	1184-1199	
Lalla Abla Mosque		Tangier	2018	
Lalla Aouda Mosque		Meknes	1276 (original foundation); 1672-178 (current mosque)	Originally the mosque of the 13th-century Marinid kasbah in Meknes, it was completely rebuilt by Moulay Isma'il as part of his new imperial capital in the late 17th century.
Lalla ez-Zhar Mosque		Fez	1357	
Lalla Ghriba Mosque		Fez	1408	
Lalla Khadija Mosque		Kenitra	N/A	
Lalla Khadija Mosque, Rabat		Rabat	N/A	
Loubnan Mosque		Agadir	1969	
Mohammed V Mosque		Tangier	1983	
Mohammed V Mosque		Agadir	1988	
Mohammed V Mosque		Fnideq	2011	
Mosque of al-Qarawiyyin		Fez	859	
Mouassine Mosque		Marrakesh	1572-73	
Moulay Abdallah Mosque		Fez	Between 1729 and 1757	A royal necropolis of the Alaouite dynasty is attached to the mosque.
Moulay Slimane Mosque		Rabat	1812	
Old Mosque (Jama' al-'Atiq)		Rabat (Kasbah of the Udayas)	1150	Founded by the Almoravids but heavily restored in later periods. Current minaret dates from the 18th century.
R'cif Mosque		Fez	1793-1822	
Said Mosque		Ksar el-Kebir	1713	
Sidi Ahmed al-Tijani Mosque		Fez	18th century	
Sidi Bou Abib Mosque		Tangier	1917	
Souq al-Ahad Mosque		Agadir	N/A	
Tinmal Mosque		Tinmel	1148	No longer operating as mosque but accessible to visitors as a historical site
Zawiya of Moulay Idris I		Moulay Idriss Zerhoun	Probably first established in 9th century, but rebuilt and modified many times.	Burial site of Idris I. Current structure dates from Alaouite period.
Zawiya of Moulay Idriss II		Fez	First established in 9th century, but rebuilt and modified many times.	Burial site of Idris II. Current structure dates from Alaouite period.
Zawiya of Sidi Abd el-Aziz		Marrakesh	16th century	Contains the tomb of Sidi Abd al-Aziz Abd at-Tabba', one of the Seven Saints of Marrakesh
Zawiya of Sidi Bel Abbes		Marrakesh	Established after 1204	Contains the tomb of Abu al-Abbas as-Sabti (Sidi Bel Abbes), one of the Seven Saints of Marrakesh, who died in 1204. The current building around his tomb dates from the Saadian period (16th century) and later.
Zawiya of Sidi Muhammad Ben Sliman al-Jazuli		Marrakesh	Established after 1523-24	Contains the tomb of Muhammad al-Jazuli, one of the Seven Saints of Marrakesh

== See also ==
- Islam in Morocco
- List of mosques in Africa
