= Sahn =

Islamic architectural feature

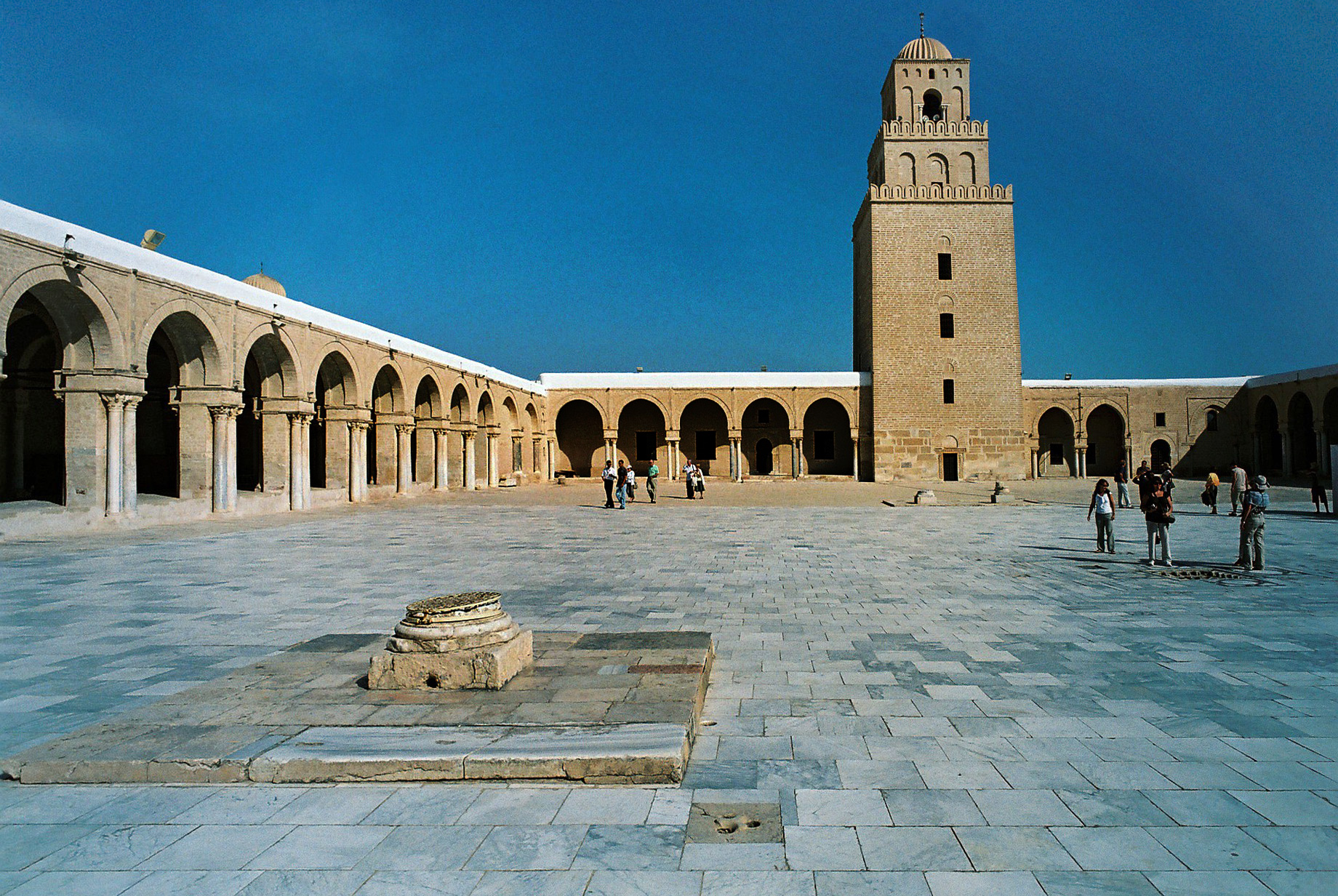
Large sahn of the Great Mosque of Kairouan, surrounded by riwaq (arcades), in Tunisia

A sahn (Arabic: صَحْن, ṣaḥn) is a courtyard in Islamic architecture, especially the formal courtyard of a mosque. Most traditional mosques have a large central sahn, which is surrounded by a riwaq or arcade on all sides.

== Etymology ==
The word sahn (صَحْن) means a courtyard in Arabic. But more commonly it means "plate", "dish".

== Form ==
The courtyard (sahn) of a mosque normally precedes and gives access to the interior prayer hall that stands on the qibla side (the side corresponding to the direction of prayer). Most mosque courtyards contained a public fountain where Muslims performed wudu, a ritual ablution (purification) required before prayer. The courtyard could be paved with stones or sometimes planted with trees.

Historically, because of the warm Middle Eastern climate, the courtyard also served as an overflow to accommodate the larger number of worshippers that came during Friday prayers. However, the hot climate could also make the outdoor space uncomfortable. As a result, arcades (rows of arches) that supported roofed galleries, known as riwaqs, were usually added around the other three sides in addition to the prayer hall side.

== History ==
The first well-described mosque in Islamic history, the Prophet's Mosque in Medina, initially consisted of a rectangular open-air enclosure, to which a roofed area supported by columns was soon added. In the 7th and 8th centuries, the mosque was expanded to become a hypostyle building with a central courtyard.

Other major early mosques, such as the Great Mosque of Kufa, the Great Mosque of Damascus (early 8th century), the Great Mosque of Cordoba (late 8th century), and the Great Mosque of Kairouan (early 9th century) all included courtyards as well. Initially, some of these courtyards – including those in the mosques of Cordoba, of Kairouan, and of Tunis – were not lined with riwaqs (roofed arcades), but these soon became a standard feature for shade. While these examples were all hypostyle mosques, courtyards also remained a feature in later types of mosques. The four-iwan layout, common in Iran and Central Asia, involved four iwans and other halls arranged around a central courtyard. The major domed mosques of Ottoman architecture from the 15th century onward also feature arcaded courtyards preceding their prayer halls.

== See also ==
- durqāʿa: central space in a building
- Index: Islamic architectural elements
