= Fez, Morocco =

Fez فاس (Arabic) ⴼⴰⵙ (Standard Moroccan Tamazight)
- City
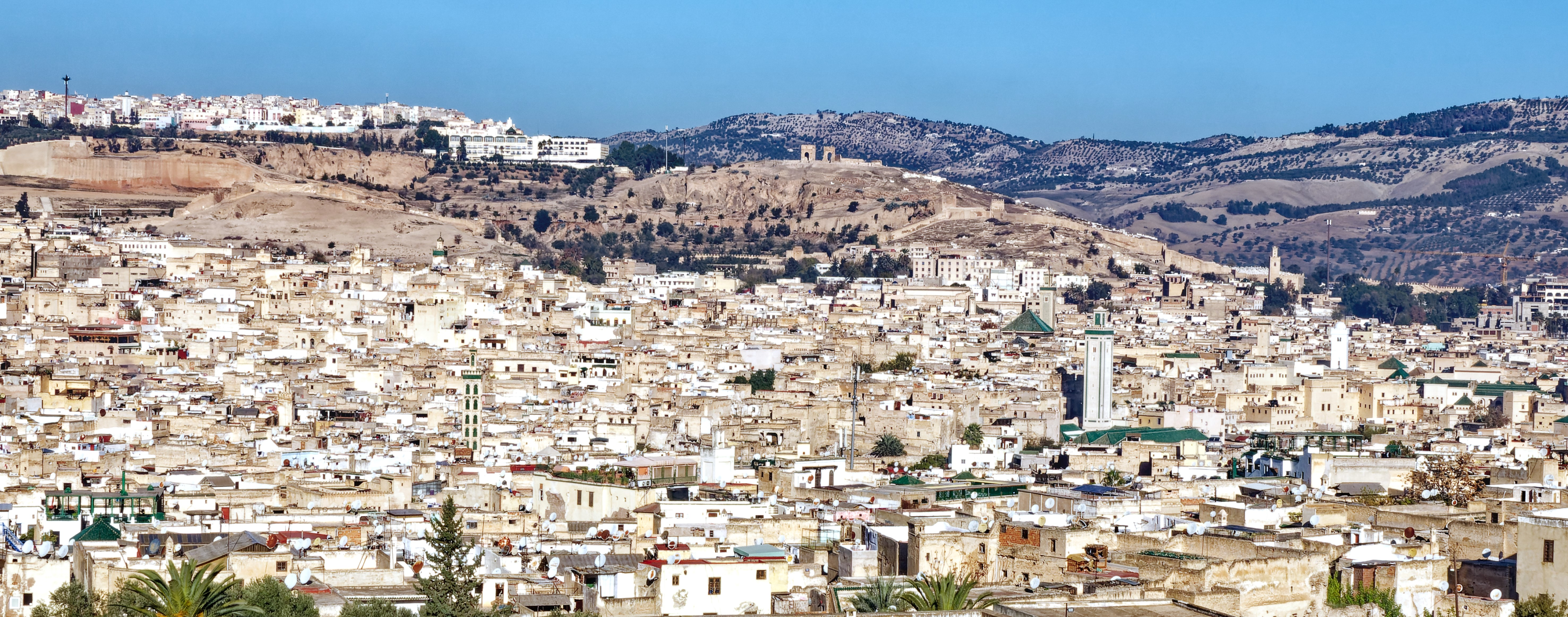
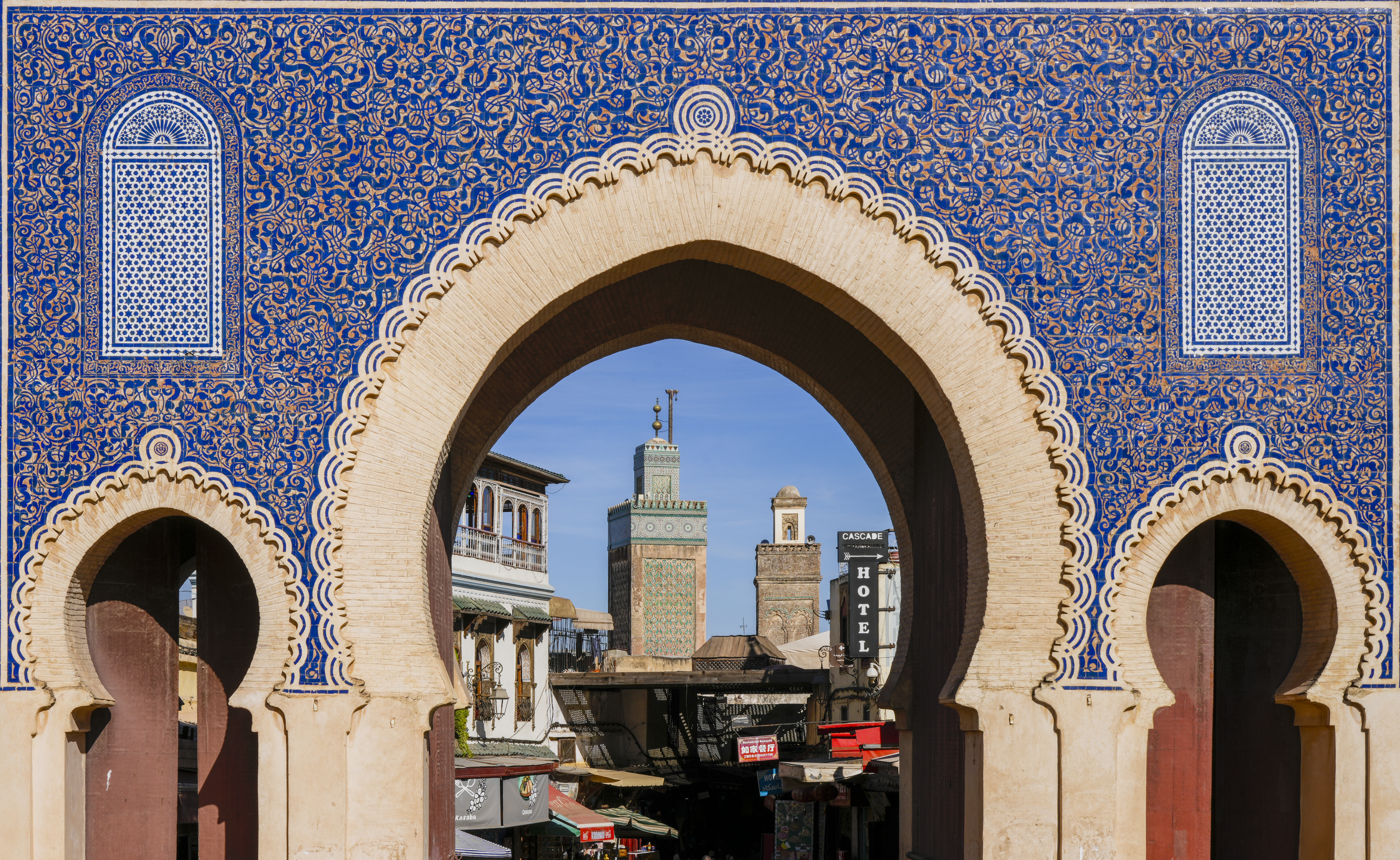
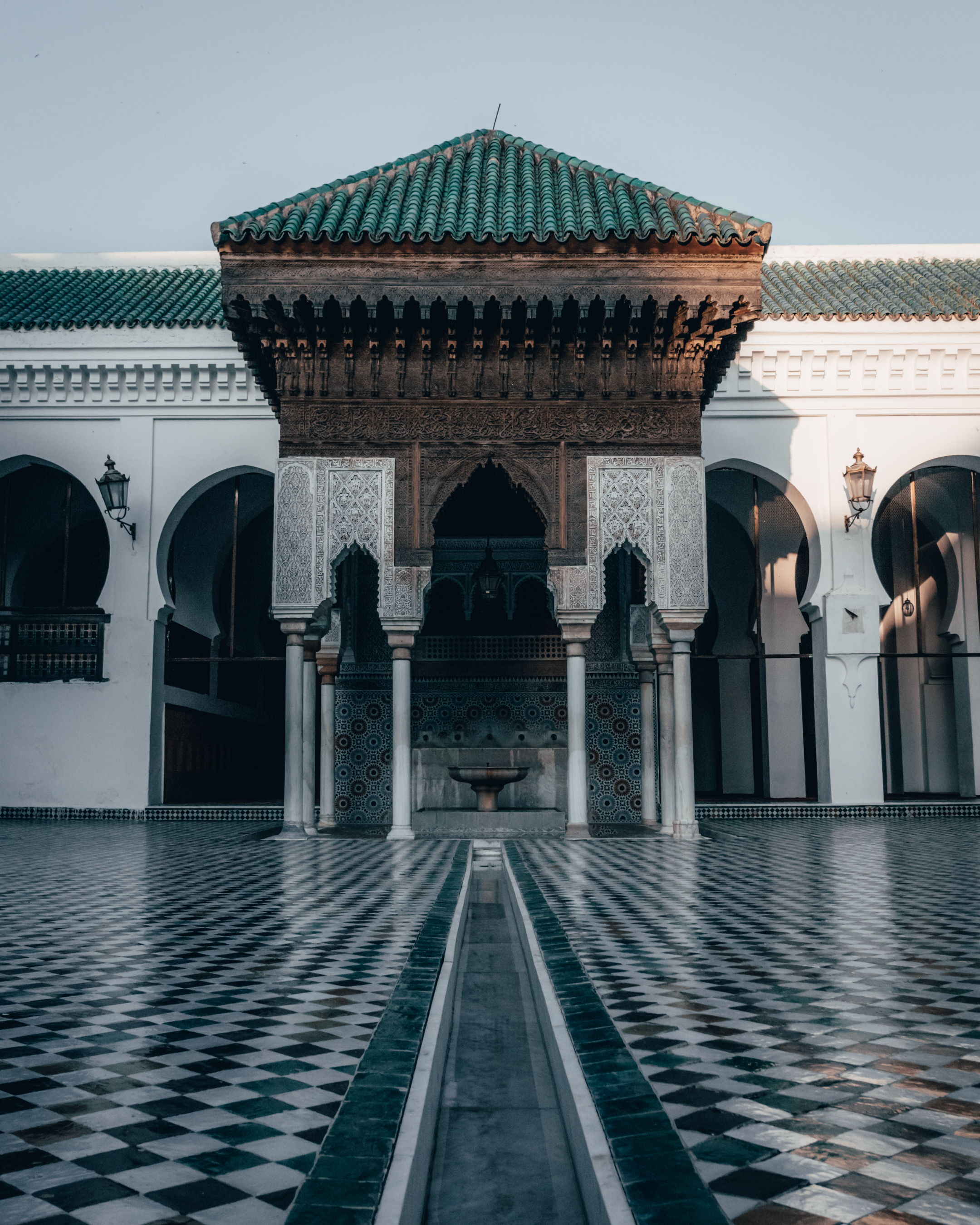
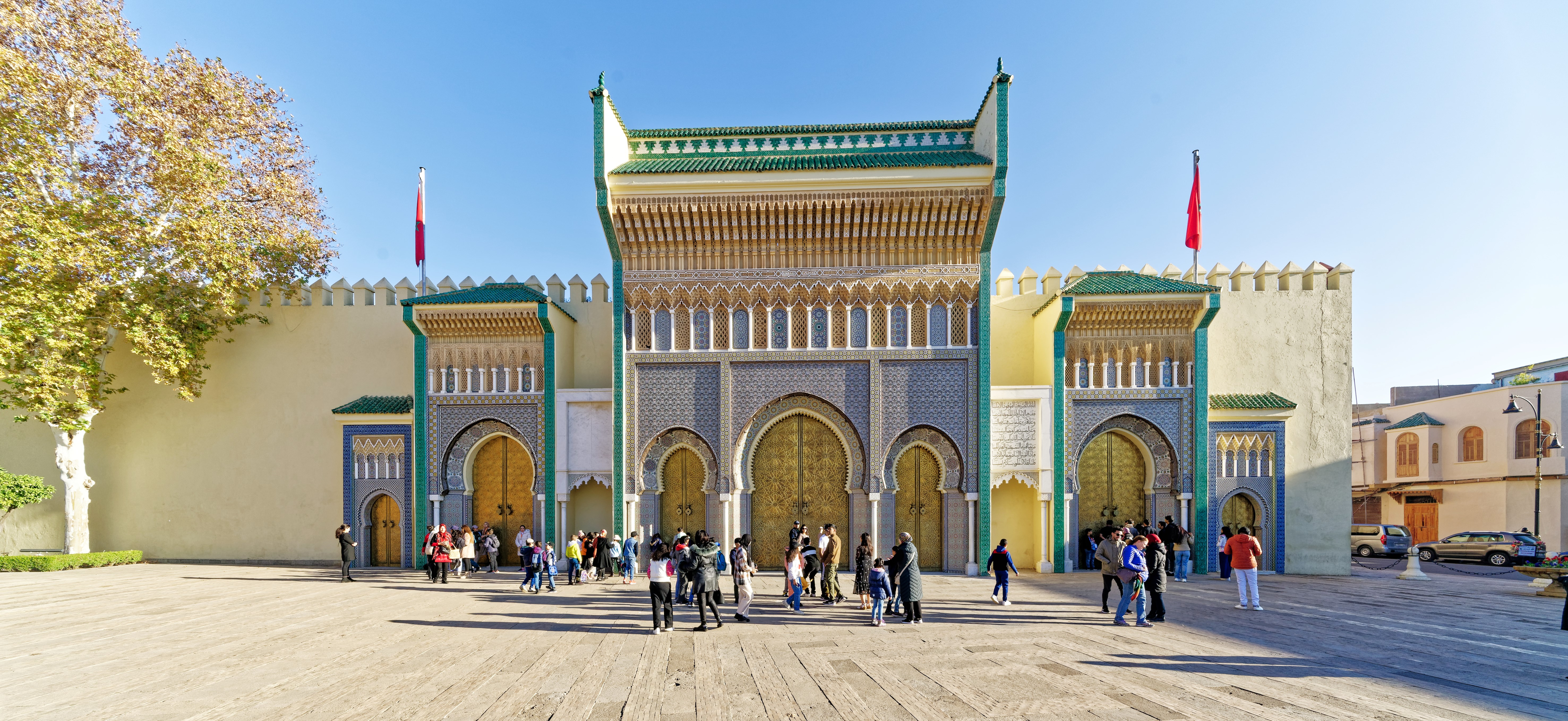
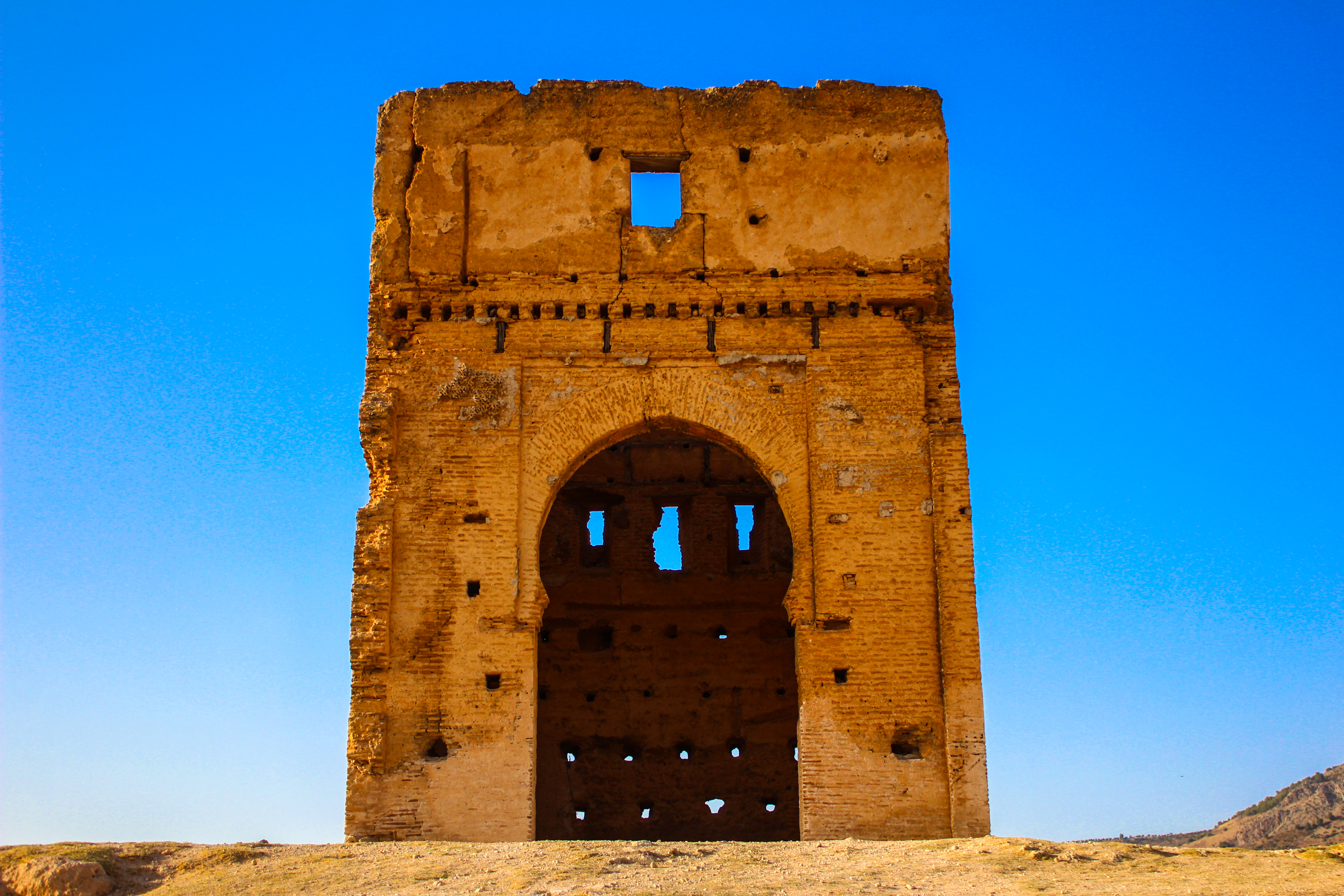
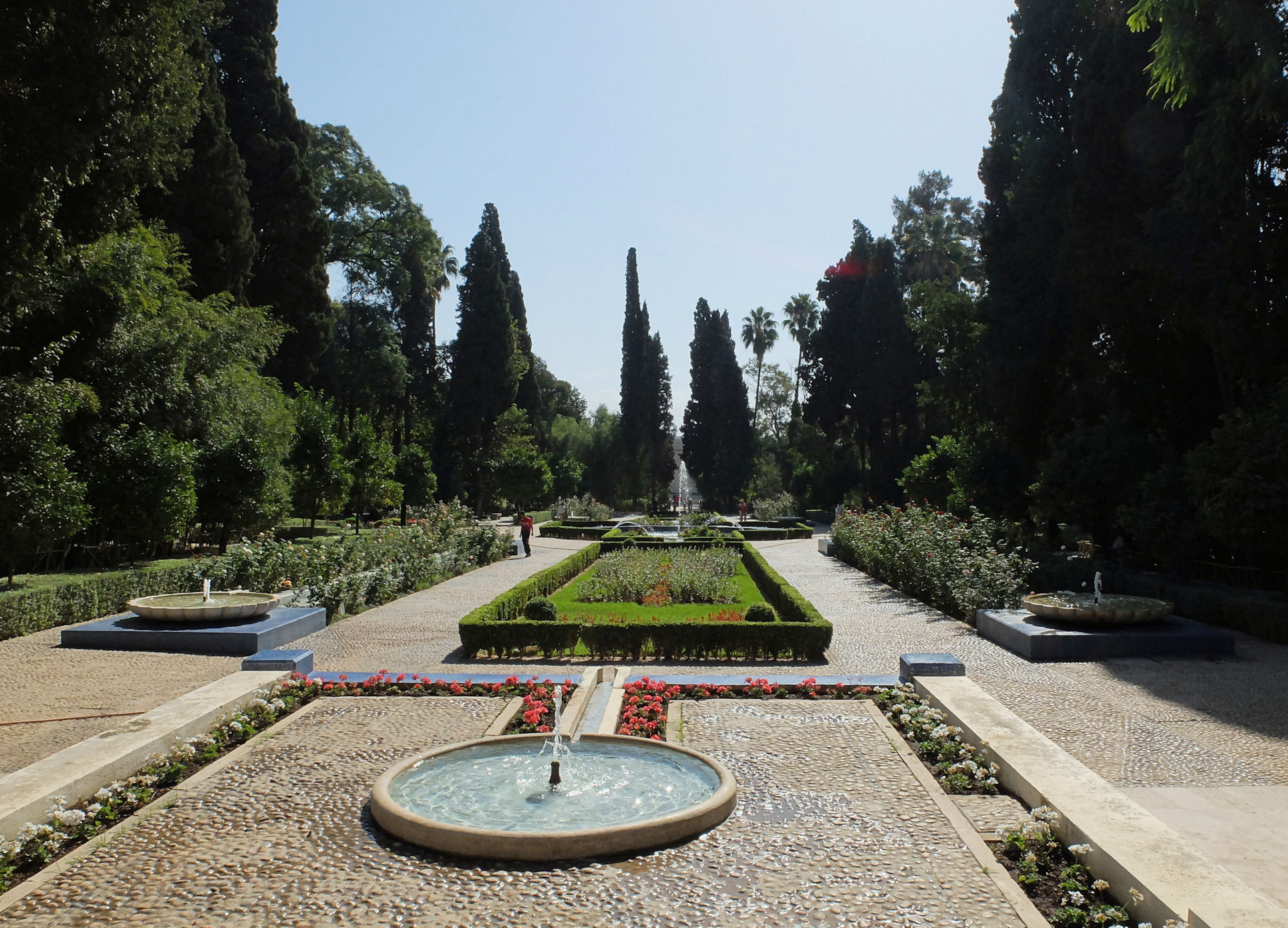
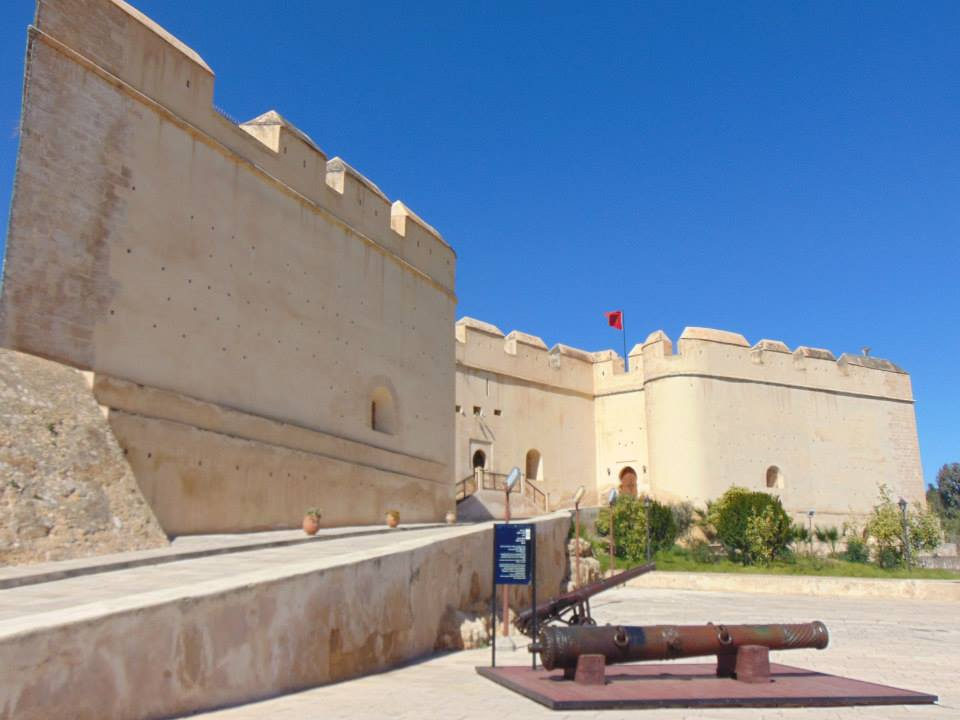
- View of Fes el Bali Bab Bou Jeloud University of al-Qarawiyyin Royal Palace of Fez Marinid Tombs Jnan Sbil Gardens Borj Nord
- Interactive map of Fez
- Coordinates: (1,100,000) 34°02′36″N 05°00′12″W
- Country: Morocco
- Region: Fez-Meknes
- Founded: 789
- Founder: Idrisid dynasty

Government
  - Mayor: Abdeslam Bekkali (RNI)
  - Governor: Khaled Ait Taleb

Area
  - Urban: 320 km^{2} (120 sq mi)
- Elevation: 414 m (1,358 ft)

Population (2024)
  - City: 1,256,172
  - Rank: 3rd in Morocco
  - Density: 3,570/km^{2} (9,250/sq mi)
  - Demonym: Fessi
- Time zone: UTC+0 (GMT)
- Postal code: 30000
- Area code: +212 (53)

UNESCO World Heritage Site
- Official name: Medina of Fez
- Type: Cultural
- Criteria: iii, iv
- Designated: 1981
- Reference no.
- Region: Arab States

Fez (/fɛz/) or Fes (Note: Arabic: فاس, romanized: fās; Standard Moroccan Tamazight: ⴼⴰⵙ) (/fɛs/) is a city in northern inland Morocco and the capital of the Fez-Meknes administrative region. It is one of the largest cities in Morocco, with a population of 1.256 million, according to the 2024 census. Located to the northwest of the Atlas Mountains, it is surrounded by hills and the old city is centered around the Fez River (Oued Fes) flowing from west to east.

Founded under Idrisid rule during the 8th century CE, Fez initially consisted of two autonomous and competing settlements. Successive waves of mainly Arab immigrants from Ifriqiya (Tunisia) and al-Andalus (Spain/Portugal) in the early 9th century gave the nascent city its Arab character. After the downfall of the Idrisid dynasty, other empires came and went until the 11th century when the Almoravid Sultan Yusuf ibn Tashfin united the two settlements into what is today's Fes el-Bali (lit. 'Old Fes') quarter, a.k.a. Medina of Fez. Under Almoravid rule, the city gained a reputation for religious scholarship and mercantile activity.

Fez reached its zenith in the Marinid era (13th–15th centuries), regaining its status as the political capital. Numerous new madrasas and mosques were constructed, many of which survive today, while other structures were restored. These buildings are counted among the hallmarks of Moorish and Moroccan architectural styles. In 1276 the Marinid sultan Abu Yusuf Yaqub also founded the royal administrative district of Fes Jdid (lit. 'New Fez'), where the Royal Palace (Dar al-Makhzen) is still located today, to which extensive gardens were later added. During this period the Jewish population of the city grew and the Mellah (Jewish quarter) was formed on the south side of this new district. After the overthrow of the Marinid dynasty, the growth of Fez stalled and the city subsequently competed with Marrakesh for political and cultural influence. It became the capital again under the 'Alawi dynasty until 1912.

The city consists of two old medina quarters, Fes el-Bali and Fes Jdid, and the much larger modern urban Ville Nouvelle area founded during the French colonial era. The Medina of Fez is listed as a World Heritage Site and is one of the world's largest and oldest urban pedestrian zones (car-free areas). It contains the University of al-Qarawiyyin which was founded in 857 and is the oldest continuously functioning institute of higher education in the world. It also contains the Chouara Tannery from the 11th century, one of the oldest tanneries in the world.

== Etymology ==
The name of the city in Arabic is فاس Fās (or ڢاس in traditional Maghrebi script), from which the English names Fez, Fès, and Fas are derived. According to some traditions, the city's name comes from the Arabic word فأس Faʾs, meaning pickaxe. Various legends have been reported to explain this etymology. One tells the story of a gold pickaxe found on site during the city's construction, while another claims that Idris I used a silver and gold pickaxe to dig alongside his workers. Another account reported by Ibn Abi Zar claims that an ancient city named "Sef" had previously existed on the site and that Idris I reversed the letters of this name to create the name "Fes". It was also suggested that the name is a Zenati form of "afas" meaning "ruins", as Fez may have been built on the ruins of an older city. A further hypothesis suggests that it comes from "Fazaz", which is the name of a nearby region, or from "فحص (faẖs)" meaning "plain wide land".

During the rule of the Idrisid dynasty (788 to 974), Fez consisted of two cities: Fās, founded by Idris I, and al-ʿĀliyá, founded by his son, Idris II. During this period the capital city was known as al-ʿĀliyá, with the name Fās being reserved for the separate site on the other side of the river. No Idrisid coins have been found with the name Fez, only al-ʿĀliyá and al-ʿĀliyá Madinat Idris. It is not known whether the name al-ʿĀliyá ever referred to both urban areas. The two cities were united in 1070 and the name Fās was used for the combined site.

== History ==
=== Foundation and the Idrisids ===
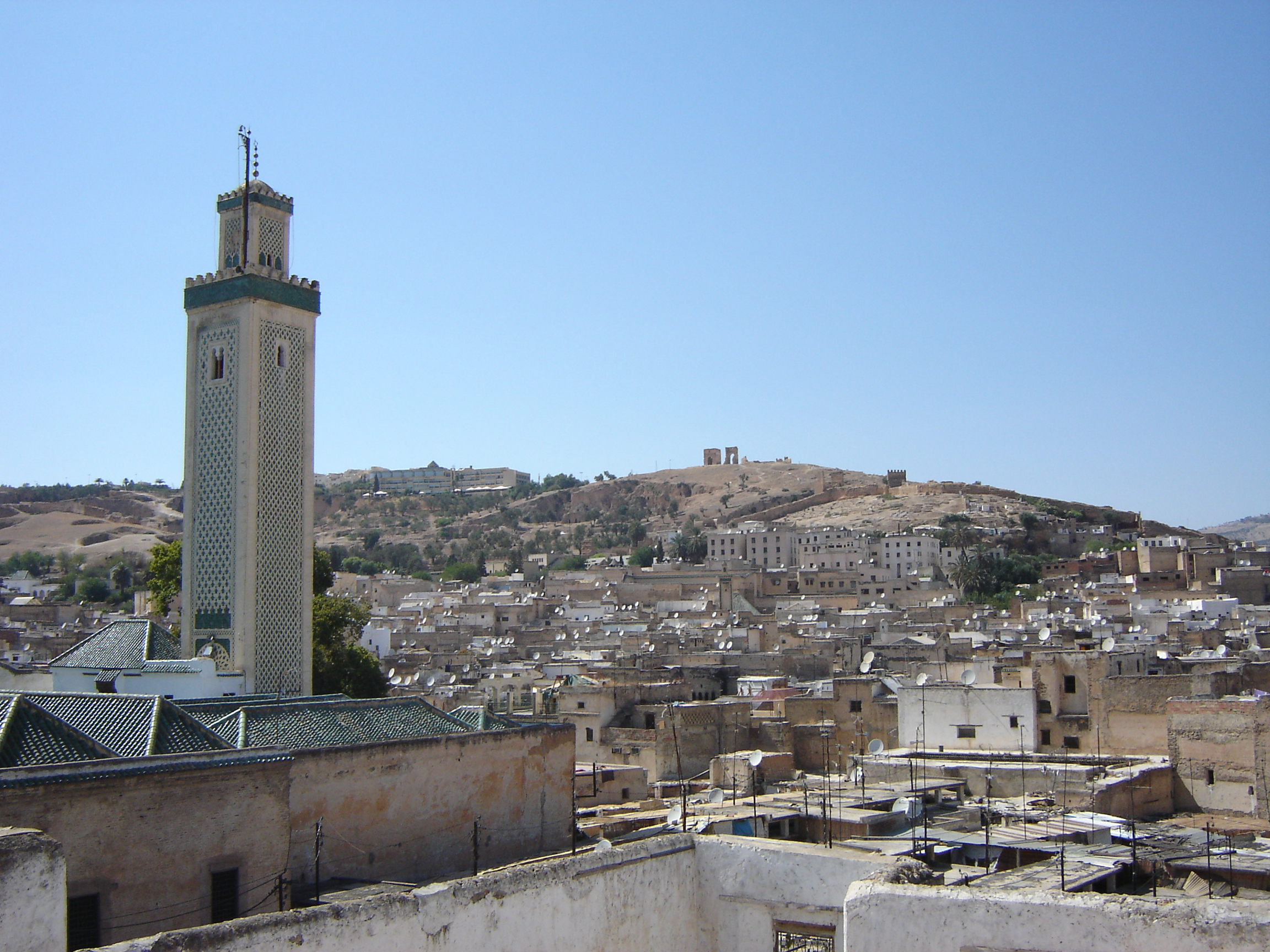
View of Fes el-Bali and the minaret of the Zawiya of Moulay Idris II, which commemorates Idris II, one of the founders of Fez

The city was first founded in 789 as Madinat Fas on the southeast bank of the Jawhar River (now known as the Fez River) by Idris I, founder of the Idrisid dynasty. Idris I was an Hasanid Sharif from Arabia who was forced to flee the Hejaz after a failed revolt against the Abbasid Caliphate, eventually moving to northern Morocco and conquering much of the area. His son, Idris II, built a settlement called al-ʿĀliyá on the opposing river bank in 809 and moved his capital here from Walili (Volubilis). The early population was composed mostly of Berbers, along with hundreds of Arab warriors from Kairouan who made up Idris II's entourage.

Arab immigration to Fez increased afterwards. Andalusi families of mixed Arab and Iberian descent, who were expelled from Córdoba after a rebellion in 817–818 against al-Hakam I, were one major component of the immigrant population. These families mainly settled in Madinat Fas. The immigrants from Kairouan and al-Andalus gave the city its Arabic character and would subsequently give their name to the districts of 'Adwat Al-Andalus and 'Adwat al-Qarawiyyin. The city also had a prominent Jewish community, probably consisting of Zenata Berbers who had previously converted to Judaism, as well as a small remaining Christian population for a time. The Jews were especially concentrated in a northeastern district of al-ʿĀliyá, known as Funduq el-Yihoudi (near the present-day Bab Guissa gate).

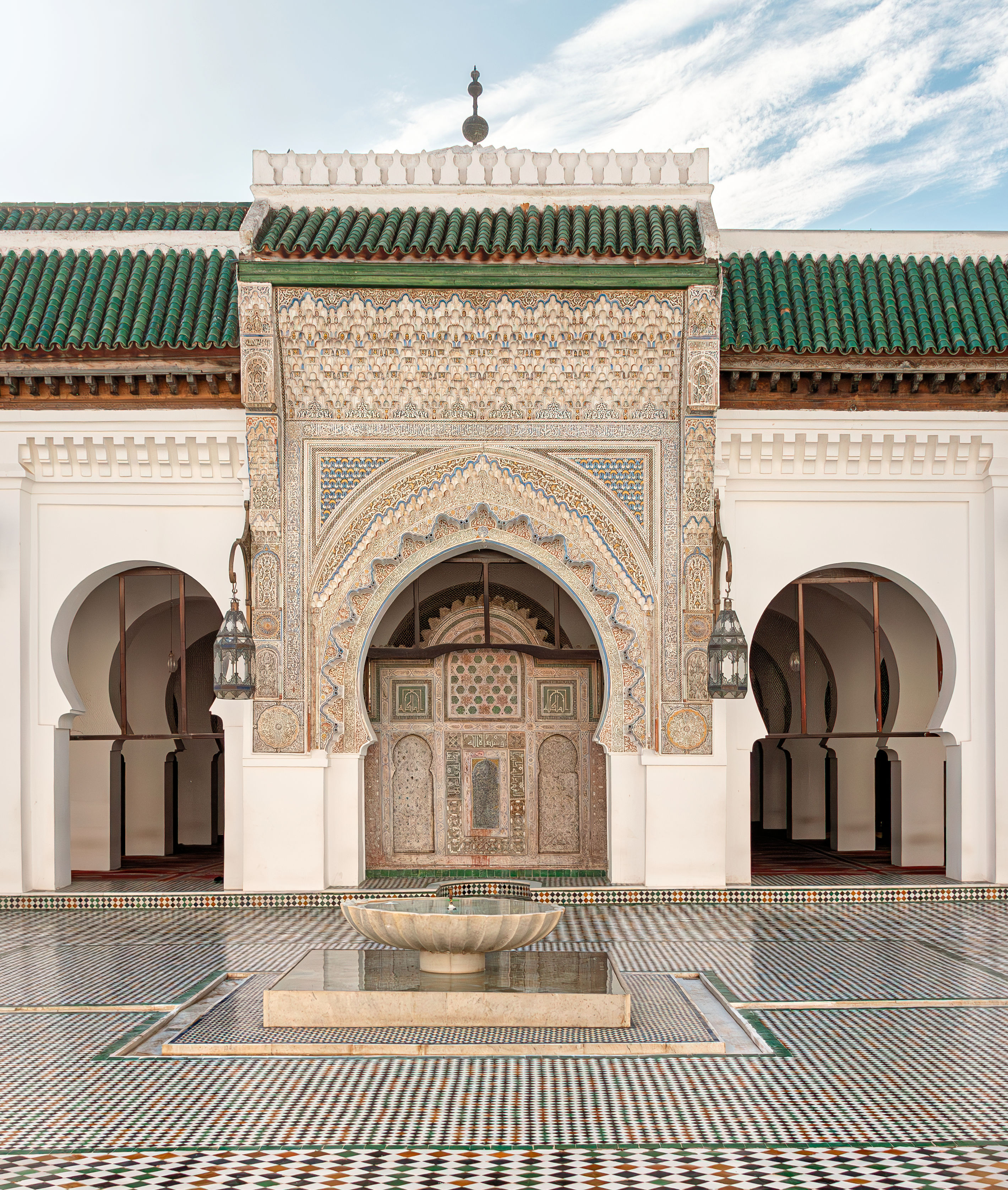
Interior of the Qarawiyin Mosque, founded in 859

Following the death of Idris II in 828 the region was divided among his sons. The eldest, Muhammad, received Fez, but some of his brothers attempted to break away from his leadership, resulting in an internecine conflict. Although the Idrisid realm was eventually reunified and enjoyed a period of peace under Ali ibn Muhammad and Yahya ibn Muhammad, it fell into decline again in the late 9th century.

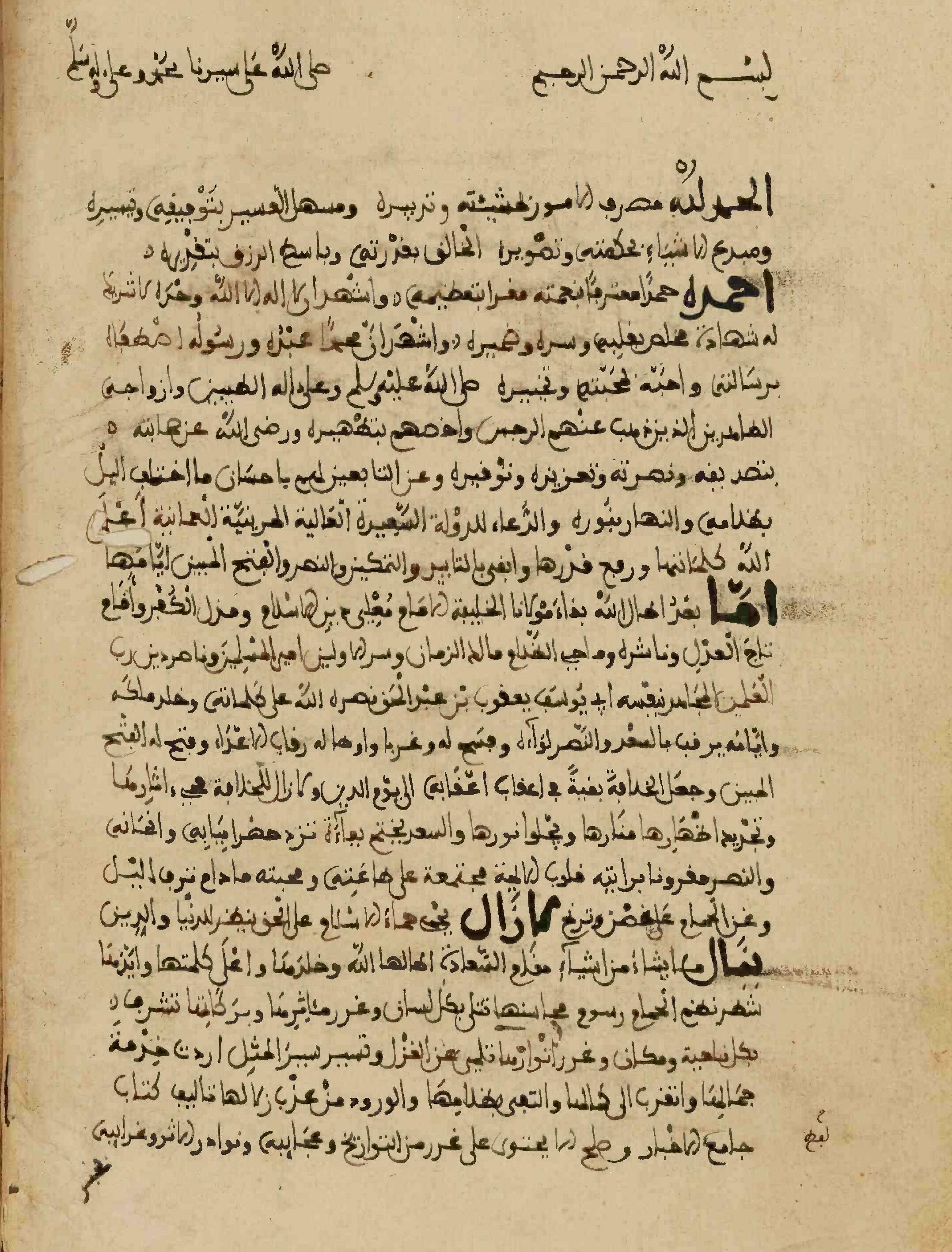
A page from a 16th-century manuscript of Rawḍ al-Qirṭās, a book about the history of Fes under the Idrisids, Banu Zanata, Almoravids, Almohads and Marinids.

In the 10th century, the city was contested by the Umayyad Caliphate of Córdoba and the Fatimid Caliphate of Ifriqiya (Tunisia), who ruled the city through a host of Zenata clients. The Fatimids took the city in 927 and expelled the Idrisids definitively, after which their Miknasa (one of the Zenata tribes) were installed there. The city, along with much of northern Morocco, continued to change hands between the proxies of Córdoba and the proxies of the Fatimids for many decades. Following another successful invasion by Buluggin ibn Ziri in 979 and a brief period of Fatimid control, the forces of Al-Mansur of Cordoba managed to retake the region again, expelling the Fatimids permanently. From 980 (or from 986), Fez was ruled by a Zenata dynasty from the Maghrawa tribe, who were allies of the Caliphate of Córdoba. They maintained this control even after the Caliphate's collapse in the early 11th century and until the arrival of the Almoravids.

Fez continued to grow under Zenata control, even though conflicts between its two settlements, Madinat Fas and al-ʿĀliyá, flared up during periods of political rivalry. Ziri ibn Atiyya, the first ruler of the new dynasty, had a troubled reign. However, Ibn Atiyya's descendant Dunas ibn Hamama, ruling between 1037 and 1049, was responsible for improving the city's infrastructure. He developed much of Fez's water supply system, which has largely survived up to the present day. Other structures built in his time included hammams (bathhouses), mosques, and the first bridges over the Oued Bou Khrareb (mostly rebuilt in later eras). The two cities became increasingly integrated: the open space between the two was filled up by new houses and up to six bridges across the river allowed for easier passage between them. A decade after Dunas, between 1059 and 1061, the two cities were ruled separately by two brothers who were rival Zenata emirs that fought with each other: al-ʿĀliyá was controlled by an emir named Al-Gisa and Madinat Fas was controlled by Al-Fetouh. Both brothers fortified their respective shores, and their names have been preserved in two of the city's gates to this day: Bab Guissa (or Bab Gisa) in the north and Bab Ftouh in the south.

=== Almoravids, Almohads and Marinids ===
In 1069–1070 (or possibly a few years later), Fez was conquered by the Almoravids under Yusuf ibn Tashfin. In the same year of this conquest, Yusuf ibn Tashfin unified Madinat Fas and al-ʿĀliyá into one city. The walls dividing them were destroyed, bridges connecting them were built or renovated, and a new circuit of walls was constructed that encompassed both cities. A kasbah (Arabic term for "citadel") was built at the western edge of the city (just west of Bab Bou Jeloud today) to house the city's governor and garrison. Although the capital was moved to Marrakesh under the Almoravids, Fez acquired a reputation for Maliki legal scholarship and remained an important centre of trade and industry. Almoravid impact on the city's structure was such that Yusuf ibn Tashfin is sometimes considered to be the second founder of Fez.

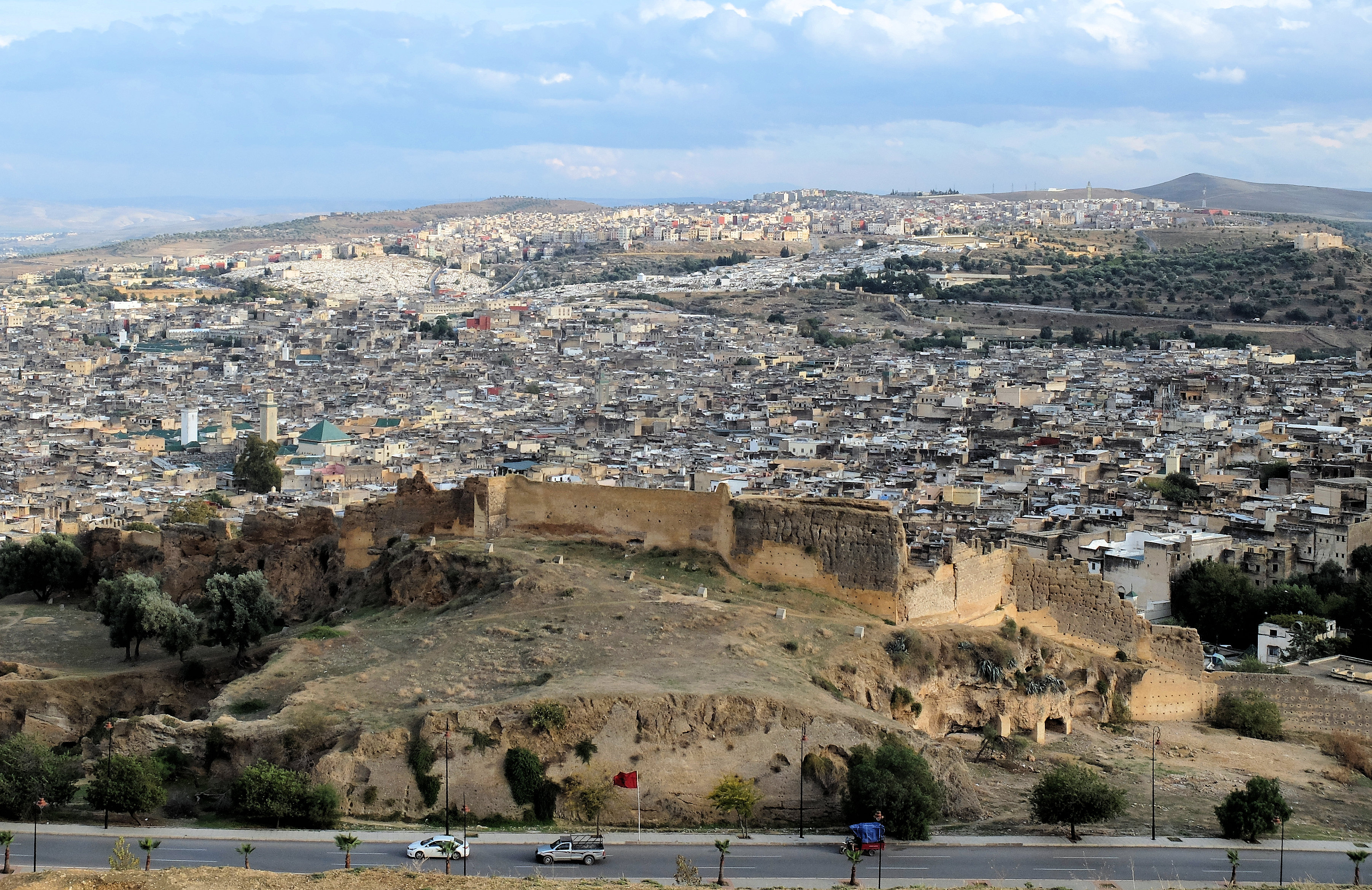
Remains of the city walls on the north side of Fes el-Bali, which were rebuilt during the Almohad period (12th-13th century)

In 1145 the Almohad leader Abd al-Mu'min besieged and conquered the city during the Almohad overthrow of the Almoravids. Due to the ferocious resistance they encountered from the local population, the Almohads demolished the city's fortifications. However, due to Fez's continuing economic and military importance, the Almohad caliph Ya'qub al-Mansur ordered the reconstruction of the ramparts. The walls were completed by his successor Muhammad al-Nasir in 1204, giving them their definitive shape and establishing the perimeter of Fes el-Bali to this day. The Almohads built the Kasbah Bou Jeloud on the site of the former Almoravid kasbah and also built the first kasbah occupying the site of the current Kasbah an-Nouar. Not all the land within the city walls was densely inhabited; much of it was still relatively open and was occupied by crops and gardens used by the inhabitants. During the 12th century, the city was one of the largest in the world, with an estimated population of 200,000. By 1200, Fez and Cairo had probably become the largest Muslim cities.

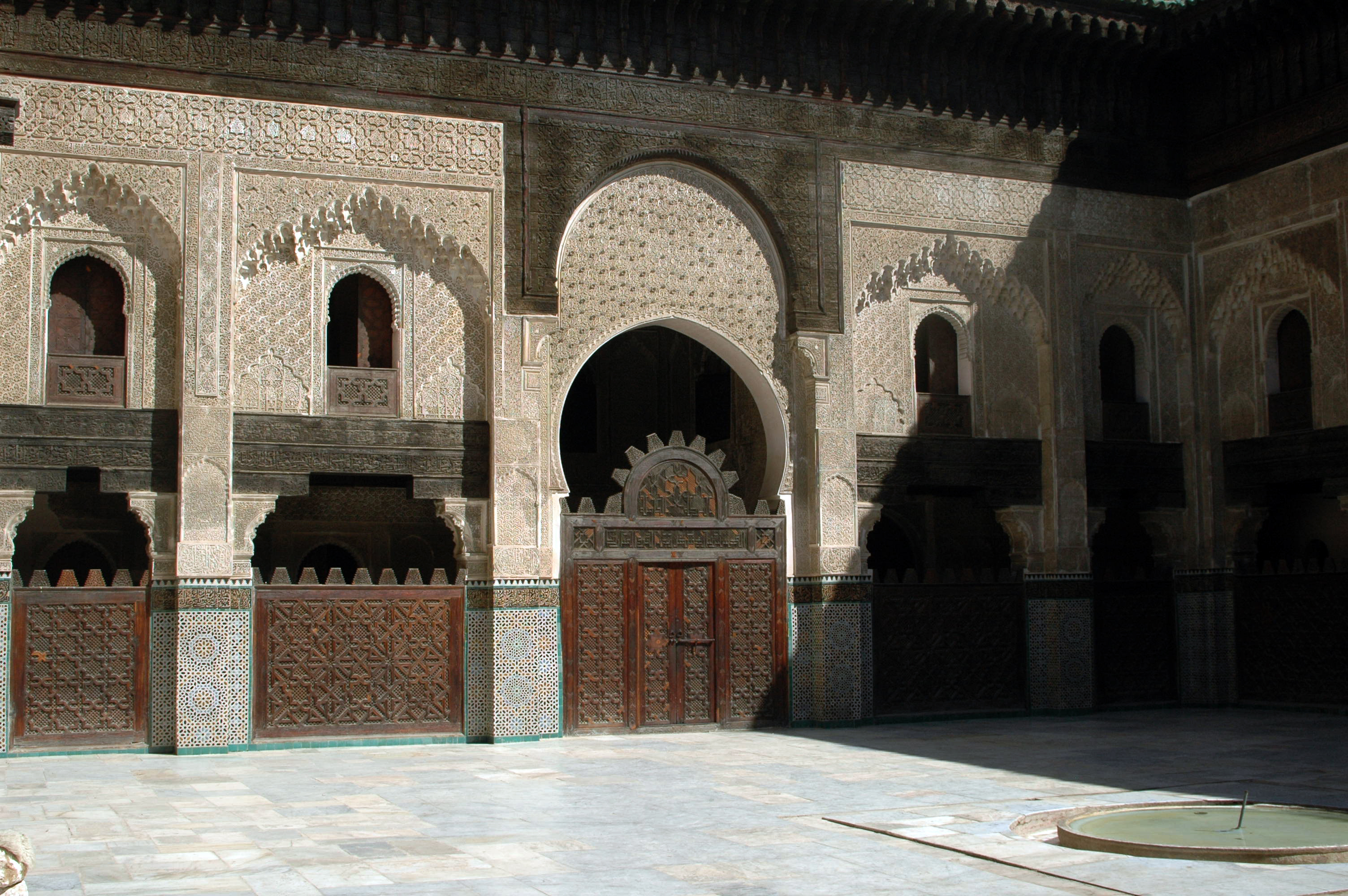
The Bou Inania Madrasa, the most important madrasa built by the Marinids in Fes (14th century)

In 1250, Fez regained its status as the capital under the Marinid dynasty. The city reached its golden age in the Marinid period. In 1276, an anti-Marinid revolt resulted in a massacre of the Jewish community that was stopped by the intervention of the ruler Abu Yusuf Ya'qub. Following the revolt, Abu Yusuf Yaqub founded Fes Jdid as the new administrative and military centre. Under the Marinids, many of the principal monuments in the medina were built and the city established its reputation as an important intellectual centre. Between 1271 and 1357 seven madrasas were built, which are among the best examples of Moroccan architecture and some of the most richly decorated monuments in Fez.

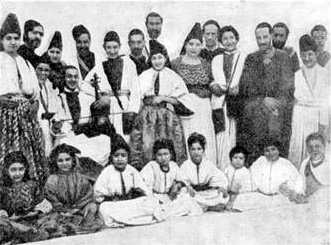
Jews of Fez photographed in the 1900s. The Mellah was the traditional Jewish quarter of the city since the 15th century.

The Jewish quarter of Fez, the Mellah, was created in Fes Jdid at some point during the Marinid period. The exact date and circumstances of its formation are not firmly established, but many scholars date the transfer of the Jewish population from Fes el-Bali to the new Mellah to the 15th century, a period of political tension and instability. In particular, Jewish sources describe the transfer as a consequence of the rediscovery of Idris II's body in the heart of the city in 1437, which caused the surrounding area—if not the entire city—to acquire a holy (haram) status, requiring that non-Muslims be removed from the area. The Moroccan Jewish community had initially consisted of indigenous local Jews (known as the Toshavim) but these were joined by Western Sephardic Jews fleeing from the Iberian Peninsula (known as the Megorashim) in subsequent generations, especially after the 1492 expulsion of Jews from Spain and 1496 expulsion of Jews from Portugal.

The 1465 Moroccan revolt overthrew the last Marinid sultan. In 1472 the Wattasids, another Zenata dynasty which had previously served as viziers under the Marinid sultans, succeeded as rulers of Morocco from Fez. They perpetuated the structure of the Marinid state and continued its policies, but were unable to control all of Morocco. They did not contribute significantly to the physical fabric of Fez.

=== Saadis and 'Alawis ===
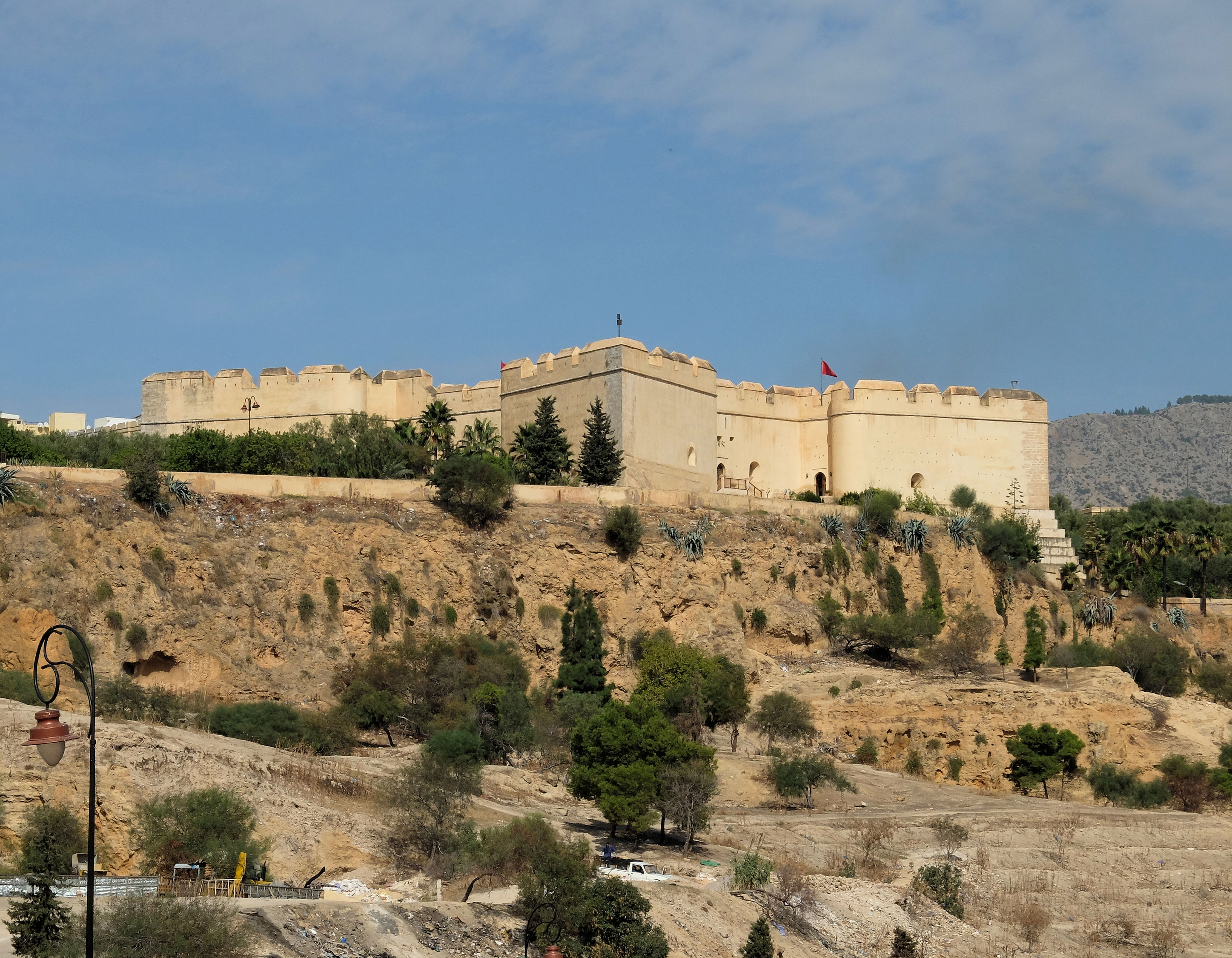
Borj Nord, a Saadi fortress built in the 16th century overlooking Fez from the north

In the 16th century the Saadis, a dynasty claiming prophetic heritage, rose to power in southern Morocco and challenged the Wattasids. Around the same time, the Ottoman Empire came close to Fez after its conquest of Algeria. In January 1549, the Saadi sultan Mohammed ash-Sheikh took Fez and ousted the last Wattasid sultan Ali Abu Hassun. The Wattasids later retook the city in 1554 with Ottoman support, but this reconquest was short-lived and later that same year the Wattasids were decisively defeated by the Saadis. The Ottomans attempted to invade Morocco after the assassination of Mohammed ash-Sheikh in 1558, but were stopped by his son Abdallah al-Ghalib at the Battle of Wadi al-Laban north of Fez. After the death of Abdallah al-Ghalib a new power struggle emerged. Abd al-Malik, Abdallah's brother, captured Fez with Ottoman support and ousted his nephew Abu Abdullah from the throne. This led to the Battle of Wadi al-Makhazin (also known as Battle of the Three Kings) in which Abd al-Malik's army defeated an invading Portuguese army, ensuring Moroccan independence. Abd al-Malik was killed during the battle and was succeeded by Ahmad al-Mansur (r. 1578–1603).

The Saadis, who used Marrakesh again as their capital, did not lavish much attention on Fez, with the exception of the ornate ablutions pavilions added to the Qarawiyyin Mosque's courtyard during their time. Perhaps as a result of persistent tensions with the city's inhabitants, the Saadis built a number of new forts and bastions around the city which appear to have been aimed at keeping control over the local population. (Note: They were located on higher ground overlooking Fes el-Bali, from which they would have been easily able to bombard the city with canons. These include the Kasbah Tamdert, just inside the city walls near Bab Ftouh, the fortressess of Borj Nord to the north and Borj Sud to the south, and the bastions of Borj Sheikh Ahmed, Borj Twil, and Borj Sidi Bou Nafa' to the west. These fortifications were mostly built by Sultan Ahmad al-Mansur in the late 16th century. Their design is influenced by European (probably Portuguese) military architecture in the gunpowder age.)

After the long reign of Ahmad al-Mansur, the Saadi state fell into civil war between his sons and potential successors. Fez became a rival seat of power for a number of brothers vying against other family members ruling from Marrakesh. Both cities changed hands multiple times until the internecine conflict finally ended in 1627. Despite the reunification of the realm after 1627, the Saadis were in full decline and Fez had already suffered considerably from the repeated conquests and reconquests during the conflict. In 1641, Muhammad al-Haj of the Sanhaja Dilā' Sufi order occupied Fez. The time was particularly difficult for Fessi Jews.

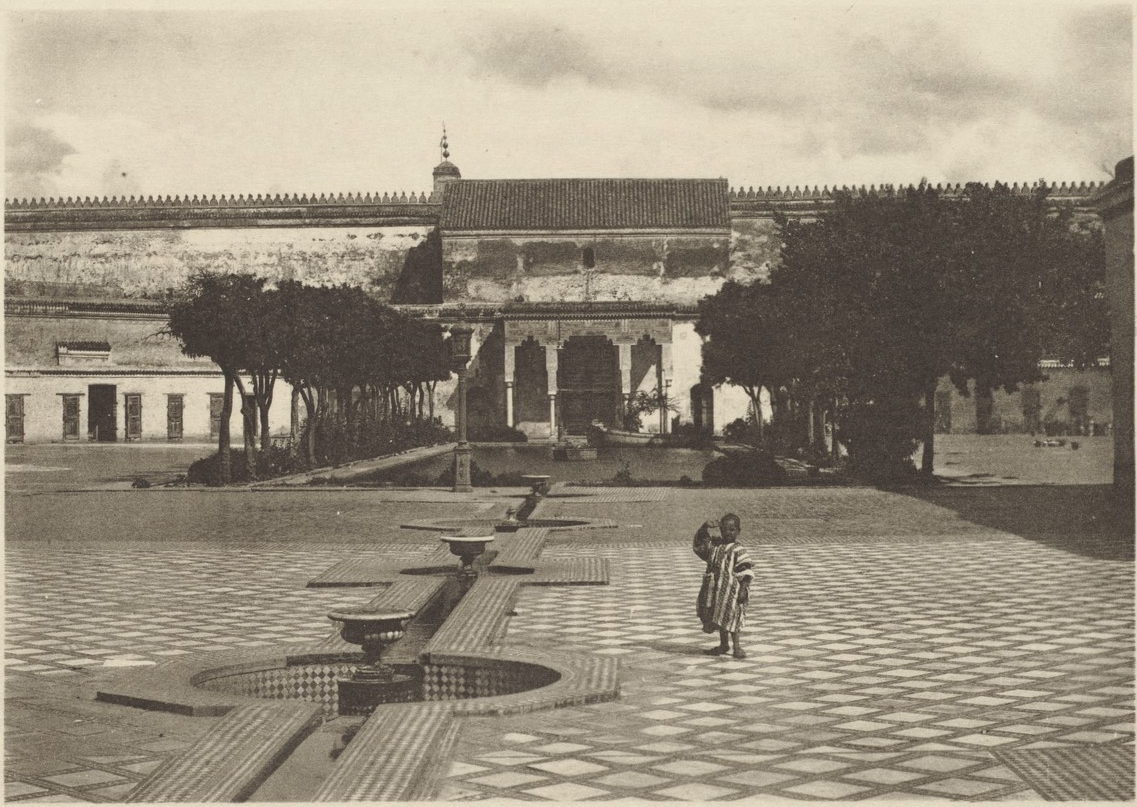
Patio of Moulay Rashid (17th century) inside the Royal Palace of Fez (photo from 1922)

It was only when the founder of the 'Alawi dynasty, Moulay Rashid, took Fez in 1666 that the city saw a revival and became the capital again, albeit briefly. Moulay Rashid set about restoring the city after a long period of neglect. He built the Kasbah Cherarda (also known as the Kasbah al-Khemis) to the north of Fes Jdid in order to house a large part of his tribal troops. He also restored or rebuilt what became known as the Kasbah an-Nouar, which became the living quarters of his followers from the Tafilalt region (the 'Alawi dynasty's ancestral home). Moulay Rashid also built a large new madrasa, the Cherratine Madrasa, in 1670.

After Rashid's death, Fez underwent another dark period. Moulay Isma'il, his successor, apparently disliked the city—possibly due to a rebellion there in his early reign—and chose nearby Meknès as his capital instead. Although he did restore or rebuild some major monuments in the city, such as the Zawiya of Moulay Idris II, he also frequently imposed heavy taxes on the city's inhabitants and sometimes even forcibly transferred parts of its population to repopulate other cities in the country. After his death, Morocco was plunged into anarchy and decades of conflict between his sons who vied to succeed him. Fez suffered particularly from repeated conflicts with the Udayas (or Oudayas), a guich tribe (vassal tribe serving as a garrison and military force) previously installed in the Kasbah Cherarda by Moulay Isma'il. Sultan Moulay Abdallah, who reigned intermittently during this period and used Fez as a capital, was initially welcomed in 1728–29 as an enemy of the Udayas, but relations between him and the city's population quickly soured due to his choice of governor. He immediately built a separate fortified palace in the countryside, Dar Dbibegh, where he resided instead. For nearly three more decades the city remained in more or less perpetual conflict with both the Udayas and the 'Alawi sultans.

Starting with the reign of Moulay Muhammad ibn Abdallah, between 1757 and 1790, the country stabilized and Fez finally regained its fortunes. Although its status was partly shared with Marrakesh, it remained the capital of Morocco for the rest of the 'Alawi period up to the 20th century. The 'Alawis continued to rebuild or restore various monuments and undertook a series of extensions to the Royal Palace. The sultans and their entourages also became more and more closely associated with the elites of Fez and other urban centers, with the ulama (religious scholars) of Fez being particularly influential. After Moulay Slimane's death, powerful families from Fez became the main players of the country's political and intellectual scene.

The Tijani Sufi order, started by Ahmad al-Tijani (d. 1815), has had its spiritual center in Fez since al-Tijani moved here from Algeria in 1789. The order spread quickly among the literary elite of North West Africa and its ulama had significant religious, intellectual, and political influence in Fez and beyond. Until the 19th century the city was the only source of fezzes (also known as the tarboosh).

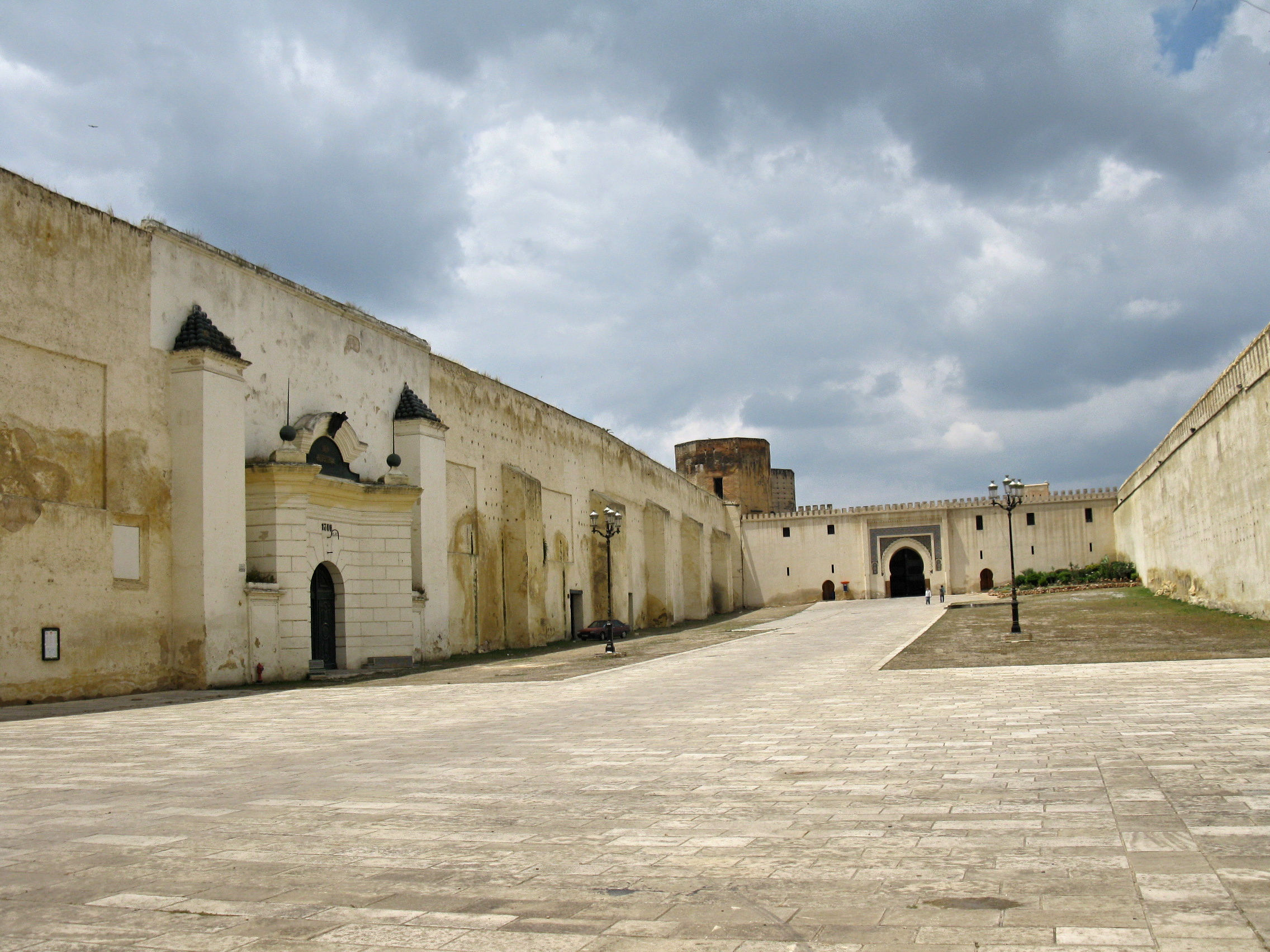
The New Mechouar, created by Moulay Hassan I in the late 19th century at the northern entrance to Fes Jdid and the Royal Palace; on the left is the entrance to the Dar al-Makina, dating from the same time

The last major change to Fez's topography before the 20th century was made during the reign of Moulay Hassan I (1873–1894), who finally connected Fes Jdid and Fes el-Bali by building a walled corridor between them. New gardens and summer palaces, used by the royals and the capital's high society, were built within the corridor, such as the Jnan Sbil Gardens and the Dar Batha palace. Moulay Hassan also expanded the old Royal Palace itself, extending its entrance up to the current location of the Old Mechouar while adding the New Mechouar, along with the Dar al-Makina, to the north. The expansion separated the Moulay Abdallah neighbourhood to the northwest from the rest of Fes Jdid.

Fez played a central role in the Hafidhiya, the brief civil war that erupted when Abdelhafid challenged his brother Abdelaziz for the throne. The ulama of Fez, led by the Sufi modernist Muhammad Bin Abdul-Kabir Al-Kattani, offered their conditioned support to Abd al-Hafid, which turned the tide of the conflict. Abdelaziz was defeated in the Battle of Marrakesh in 1908. Abdelhafid's reign soon deteriorated and in early 1911 the sultan was besieged in Fez by the tribes of the Middle Atlas. Abdelhafid appealed for French help and a French force under Colonel Charles Émile Moinier arrived in Fez on 21 May and established a command centre at Dar Dbibegh.

=== Colonial period ===
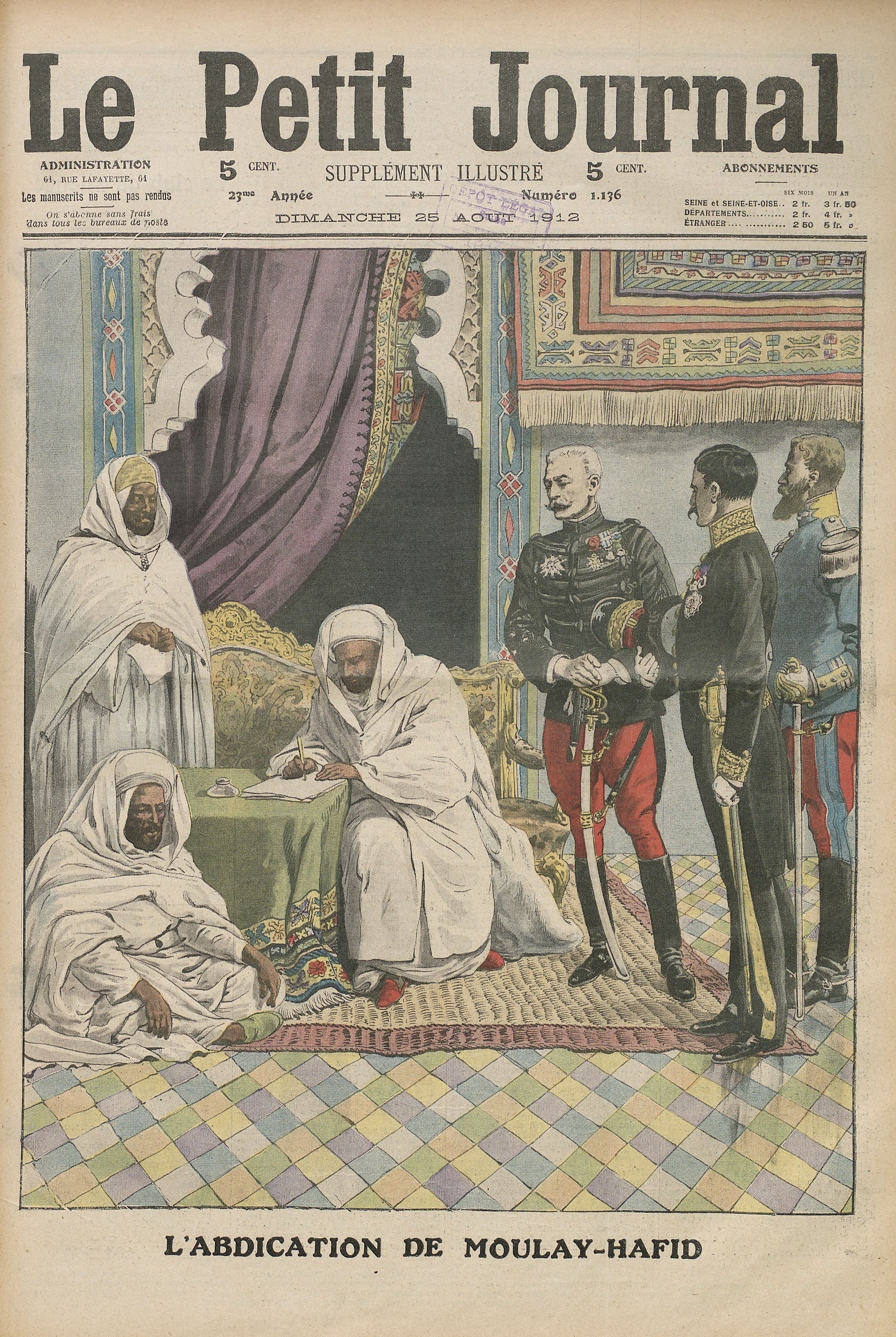
The abdication of Abd al-Hafid, Sultan of Morocco, in 1912

In 1912, French colonial rule was instituted over Morocco following the Treaty of Fes. One immediate consequence was the 1912 riots in Fez, a popular uprising which included deadly attacks targeting Europeans as well as native Jewish inhabitants in the Mellah, followed by an even deadlier repression. The first French resident general, Hubert Lyautey, decided to move the administrative capital of the Protectorate to Rabat in 1912–1913, which has remained the capital ever since.

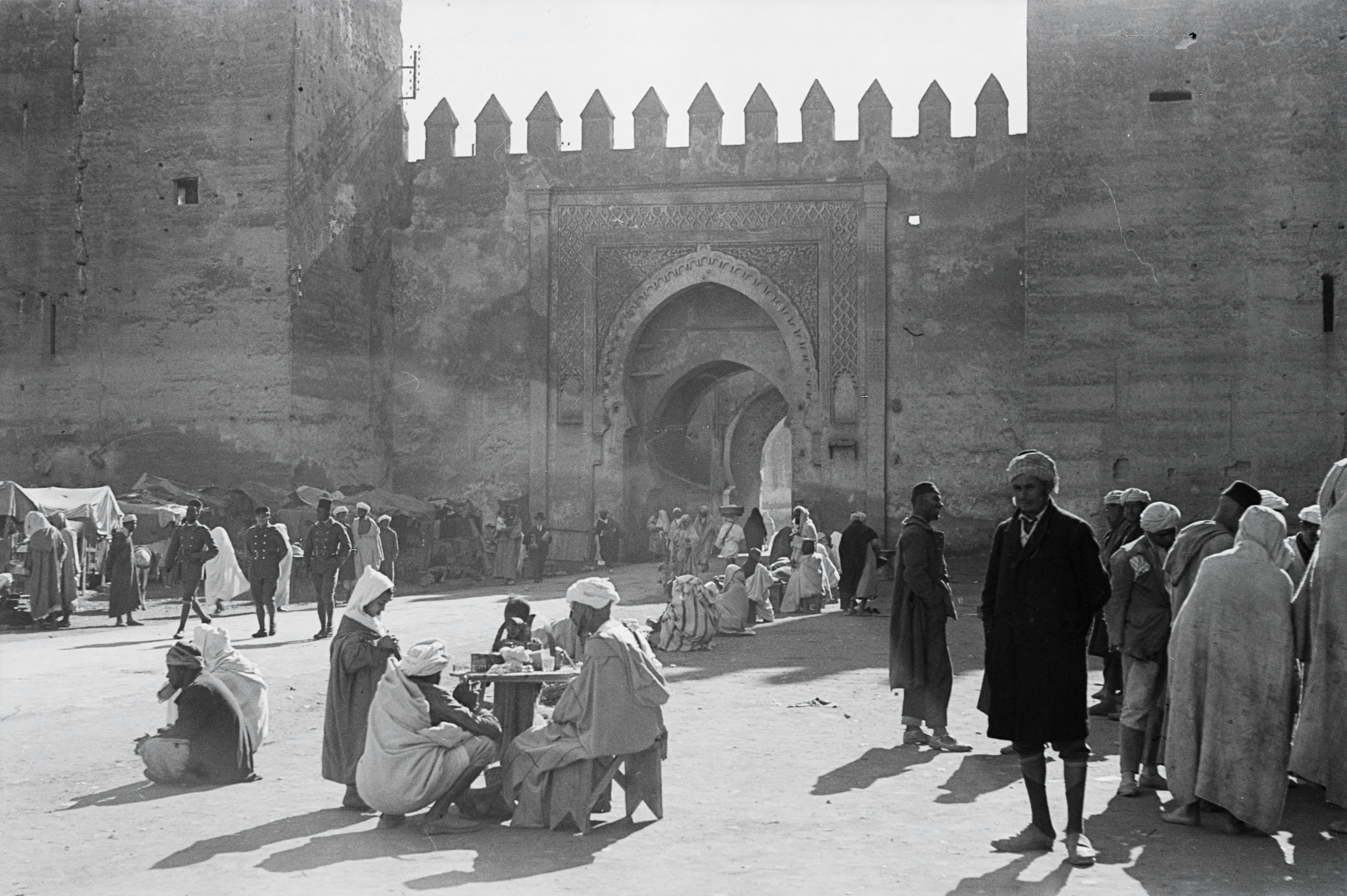
Market and street life in front of Bab Dekakkin in Fes Jdid (1932 photo)

A number of social and physical changes took place during this period and across the 20th century. Starting under Lyautey, one important policy with long-term consequences was the decision to largely forego redevelopment of existing historic walled cities in Morocco and to intentionally preserve them as sites of historic heritage, still known today as "medinas". Instead, the French administration built new modern cities (the Villes Nouvelles) just outside the old cities, where European settlers largely resided with modern Western-style amenities. This was part of a larger "policy of association" adopted by Lyautey which favoured various forms of indirect colonial rule by preserving local institutions and elites, in contrast with other French colonial policies that had favoured "assimilation". The Ville Nouvelle also became known as Dar Dbibegh by Moroccans, as the former palace of Moulay Abdallah was located in the same area.

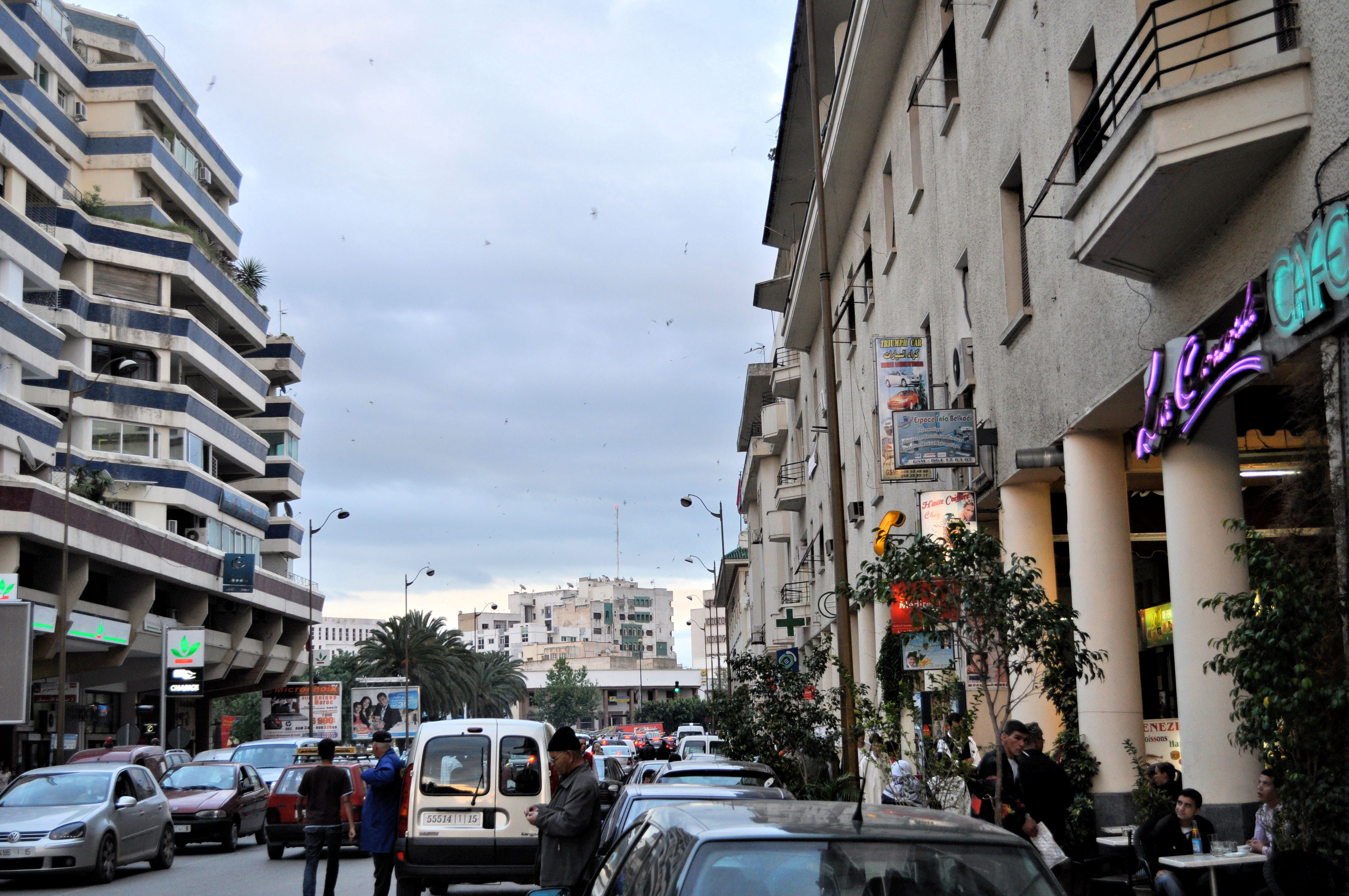
A street in the modern Ville Nouvelle ("New City") of Fez

The creation of the separate French Ville Nouvelle to the west had a wider impact on the entire city's development. While new colonial policies preserved historic monuments, they stalled urban development in heritage areas. Scholar Janet Abu-Lughod has argued that these policies created a kind of urban "apartheid" between the indigenous Moroccan urban areas, who were forced to remain stagnant in terms of urban development and architectural innovation, and the new, mainly European-inhabited planned cities, which expanded to occupy lands formerly used by Moroccans outside the city. This separation was partly softened, however, by wealthy Moroccans who started moving into the Ville Nouvelles during this period. By contrast, the old city (medina) of Fez was increasingly settled by poorer rural migrants from the countryside.

Fez also played a role in the Moroccan nationalist movement and in protests against the French colonial regime. Many Moroccan nationalists received their education at the Al-Qarawiyyin University and some of their informal political networks were established thanks to this shared educational background. In July 1930, the students and other inhabitants protested against the Berber Dahir, decreed by the French authorities in May of that year. In 1937, the Al-Qarawiyyin Mosque and R'cif Mosque were rallying points for demonstrations against a violent crackdown on Moroccan protesters in the nearby city of Meknes, which ended with French troops being deployed across Fes el-Bali, including at the mosques themselves. Towards the end of World War II, Moroccan nationalists gathered in Fez to draft a demand for independence which they submitted to the Allies on 11 January 1944. This resulted in the arrest of nationalist leaders followed by the violent suppression of protests across many cities, including Fez.

=== Post-independence era ===
After Morocco regained its independence in 1956, many of the trends begun under colonial rule continued and accelerated. Much of Fez's bourgeois classes moved to the growing metropolises of Casablanca and the capital, Rabat. The Jewish population was particularly depleted, either moving to Casablanca or emigrating to countries like France, Canada, and Israel. Although the population of the city grew, it did so only slowly up until the late 1960s, when the pace of growth accelerated. Throughout this period Fez remained the country's third largest urban center. Between 1971 and 2000, the population of the city roughly tripled from 325,000 to 940,000, making it the second largest city in Morocco. The Ville Nouvelle became the locus of further development, with new peripheral neighbourhoods–with inconsistent housing quality–spreading outwards around it. In 1963 the University of Al-Qarawiyyin was reorganized as a state university, while a new public university, Sidi Mohamed Ben Abdellah University, was founded in 1975 in the Ville Nouvelle. In 1981, the old city, consisting of Fes el-Bali and Fes Jdid, was classified as a UNESCO World Heritage Site.

Social inequalities and economic precarity were accentuated during the repressive reign of King Hassan II and the period known as the Years of Lead (roughly 1975–1990). Fez was strongly affected by unemployment and lack of housing. Austerity measures led to several riots and uprisings across other cities during the 1980s. On 14 December 1990, a general strike was called and led to protests and rioting by university students and youths in Fez. Buildings were burned and looted, including the Hôtel des Mérinides, a luxury hotel overlooking Fes el-Bali and dating to the time of Lyautey. Thousands were arrested and at least five were killed. The government promised to investigate and raise wages, though some of these measures were dismissed by the opposition.

Today Fez remains a regional capital and one of Morocco's most important cities. Many of the former notable families of Fez still make up a large part of the country's political elite. It is also a major tourism destination due to its historical heritage. In recent years efforts have been underway to restore and rehabilitate the old medina, ranging from the restoration of individual monuments to attempts to rehabilitate the Fez River.

== Geography ==
=== Location ===
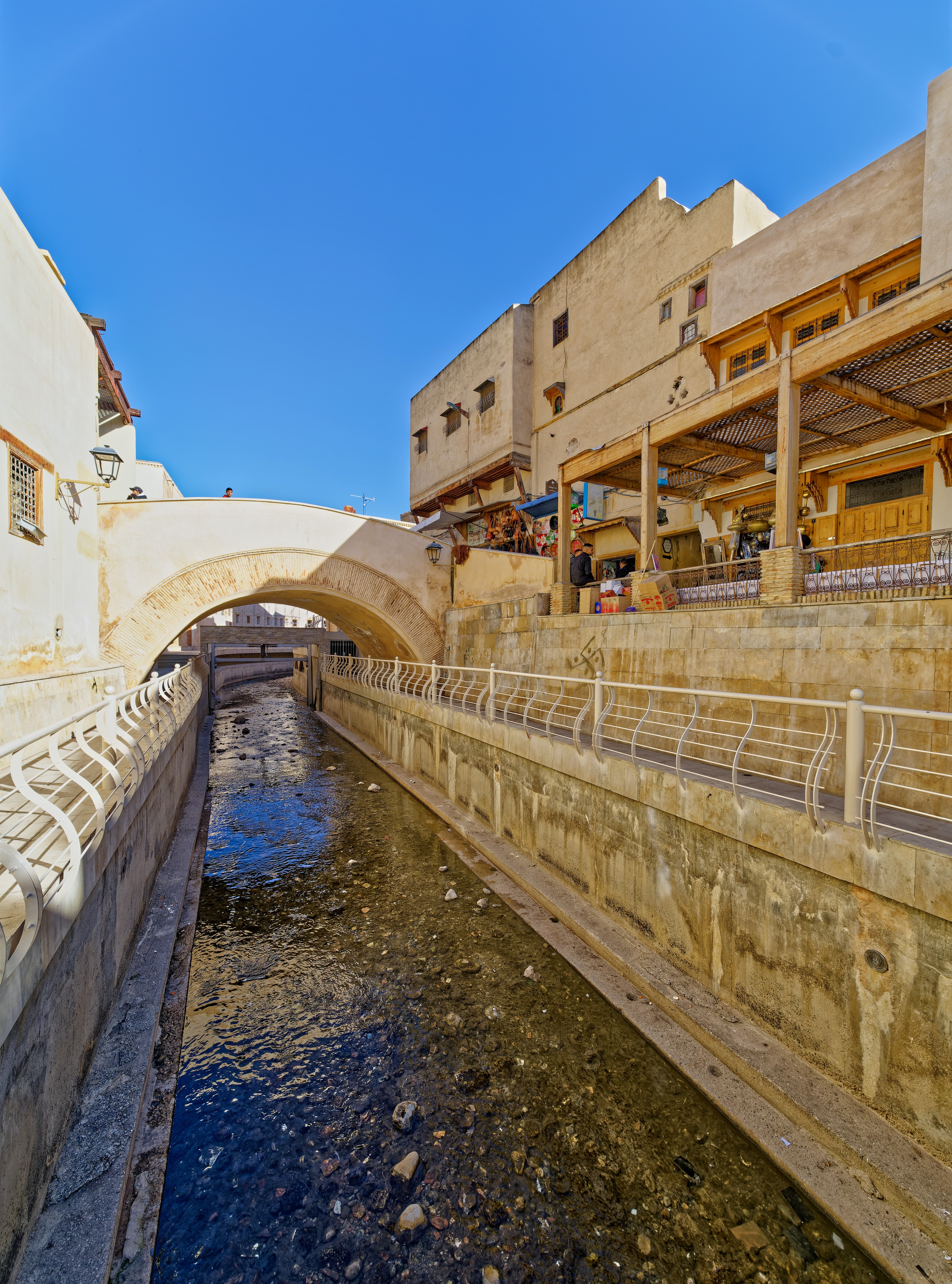
Oued Bou Khareb and its historic bridges, part of the Fez River passing in the center of Fes el-Bali

The city is divided between its historic medina (the two walled districts of Fes el-Bali and Fes Jdid) and the now much larger Ville Nouvelle (New City) along with several outlying modern neighbourhoods. The old city is located in a valley along the banks of the Oued Fes (Fez River) just above its confluence with the larger Sebou River to the northeast. The Fez River takes its sources from the south and west and is split into various small canals which provide the historic city with water. These in turn empty into the Oued Bou Khrareb, the stretch of the river which passes through the middle of Fes el-Bali and separates the Qarawiyyin quarter from the Andalusian quarter.

The new city occupies a plateau on the edge of the Saïs plain. The latter stretches out to the west and south and is occupied largely by farmland. Roughly 15 km south of Fes el-Bali is the region's main airport, Fes-Saïs. Further south is the town of Sefrou, while the city of Meknes, the next largest city in the region, is located to the southwest.

=== Climate ===
Northwest of the Middle Atlas mountains, Fez has a hot-summer Mediterranean climate (Köppen climate classification Csa) with a strong continental influence, shifting from relatively cool and wet in the winter to dry and hot days in the summer months between June and September. Rainfall can reach up to 800 mm (31 in) in good years. The winter highs typically reach around 15 °C (59 °F) and winter lows average about 4.5 °C (40 °F) in December–January. Frost is not uncommon during the winter period. The summer highs peak in July and August at approximately 34.5 °C (94 °F) with average lows of 18 °C (64 °F). The highest and lowest temperatures ever recorded in the city are 46.7 °C (116 °F) and −8.2 °C (17 °F), respectively. Snowfall on average occurs once every 3 to 5 years. Fez recorded snowfall in three straight years in 2005, 2006 and 2007.

Climate data for Fez (Fès–Saïs Airport), altitude: 579 m (1,900 ft) 1991–2020
Month	Jan	Feb	Mar	Apr	May	Jun	Jul	Aug	Sep	Oct	Nov	Dec	Year
Record high °C (°F)	25.4 (77.7)	30.5 (86.9)	33.3 (91.9)	39.0 (102.2)	41.3 (106.3)	44.0 (111.2)	46.7 (116.1)	45.7 (114.3)	42.8 (109.0)	37.5 (99.5)	32.3 (90.1)	27.0 (80.6)	46.7 (116.1)
Mean maximum °C (°F)	20.3 (68.5)	22.4 (72.3)	27.0 (80.6)	29.1 (84.4)	32.9 (91.2)	37.3 (99.1)	40.7 (105.3)	40.2 (104.4)	36.1 (97.0)	31.2 (88.2)	25.2 (77.4)	20.9 (69.6)	39.49 (103.08)
Mean daily maximum °C (°F)	16.0 (60.8)	17.3 (63.1)	19.9 (67.8)	22.0 (71.6)	26.4 (79.5)	31.2 (88.2)	35.1 (95.2)	35.1 (95.2)	30.3 (86.5)	26.1 (79.0)	20.2 (68.4)	17.2 (63.0)	24.7 (76.5)
Daily mean °C (°F)	9.9 (49.8)	10.9 (51.6)	13.3 (55.9)	15.2 (59.4)	19.0 (66.2)	23.1 (73.6)	26.5 (79.7)	26.8 (80.2)	22.9 (73.2)	19.4 (66.9)	14.1 (57.4)	11.2 (52.2)	17.7 (63.9)
Mean daily minimum °C (°F)	3.7 (38.7)	4.4 (39.9)	6.6 (43.9)	8.3 (46.9)	11.5 (52.7)	14.9 (58.8)	17.9 (64.2)	18.3 (64.9)	15.6 (60.1)	12.6 (54.7)	8.1 (46.6)	5.2 (41.4)	10.6 (51.1)
Mean minimum °C (°F)	0.3 (32.5)	1.5 (34.7)	3.0 (37.4)	5.0 (41.0)	7.3 (45.1)	11.6 (52.9)	15.1 (59.2)	15.5 (59.9)	12.6 (54.7)	8.6 (47.5)	4.0 (39.2)	1.8 (35.2)	−0.02 (31.96)
Record low °C (°F)	−8.2 (17.2)	−5.3 (22.5)	−2.5 (27.5)	−0.5 (31.1)	0.0 (32.0)	4.9 (40.8)	8.5 (47.3)	9.2 (48.6)	5.9 (42.6)	0.0 (32.0)	−1.4 (29.5)	−5.0 (23.0)	−8.2 (17.2)
Average precipitation mm (inches)	60.1 (2.37)	54.3 (2.14)	59.2 (2.33)	54.7 (2.15)	38.2 (1.50)	11.1 (0.44)	1.1 (0.04)	4.9 (0.19)	22.1 (0.87)	53.9 (2.12)	66.1 (2.60)	62.0 (2.44)	487.7 (19.20)
Average snowfall cm (inches)	1.17 (0.462)	0.81 (0.32)	0.08 (0.03)	0.0 (0.0)	0.0 (0.0)	0.0 (0.0)	0.0 (0.0)	0.0 (0.0)	0.0 (0.0)	0.0 (0.0)	0.04 (0.016)	0.49 (0.194)	2.59 (1.022)
Average precipitation days (≥ 1 mm)	6.7	6.5	6.9	6.3	4.7	1.7	0.4	1.0	2.4	5.1	6.5	6.5	54.7
Average snowy days	0.5	0.4	0.1	0.0	0.0	0.0	0.0	0.0	0.0	0.0	0.1	0.3	1.4
Average relative humidity (%)	78.3	75.9	71.5	67.3	62.7	58.9	55.4	56.8	63.8	70.6	76.2	79.0	68.0
Average dew point °C (°F)	4.3 (39.7)	5.1 (41.2)	6.9 (44.4)	8.8 (47.8)	11.5 (52.7)	14.3 (57.7)	16.0 (60.8)	16.8 (62.2)	15.3 (59.5)	12.8 (55.0)	9.0 (48.2)	5.6 (42.1)	10.5 (50.9)
Mean monthly sunshine hours	195.3	187.6	244.9	252.0	300.7	318.0	350.3	331.7	276.0	244.9	201.0	198.4	3,100.8
Percentage possible sunshine	61.8	60.9	66.4	64.6	69.8	73.1	79.0	79.8	74.2	70.0	63.8	63.9	69.6
Average ultraviolet index	4	5	7	9	10	11	11	11	8	7	5	2	8
Source 1: NOAA (sun 1981–2010)
Source 2: Voodoo Skies for extremes, Weather Atlas, January record high, WeatherSpark, Meteoblue, Open-Meteo, Weather2Visit

Climate data for Fez
Month	Jan	Feb	Mar	Apr	May	Jun	Jul	Aug	Sep	Oct	Nov	Dec	Year	
Mean daily daylight hours	10.0	11.0	12.0	13.0	14.0	14.0	14.0	13.0	12.0	11.0	10.0	10.0	12.0	
Moyenne Indice UV	3	4	4	5	6	7	7	7	6	5	3	3	5	
														Source: Weather Atlas

== Demographics ==
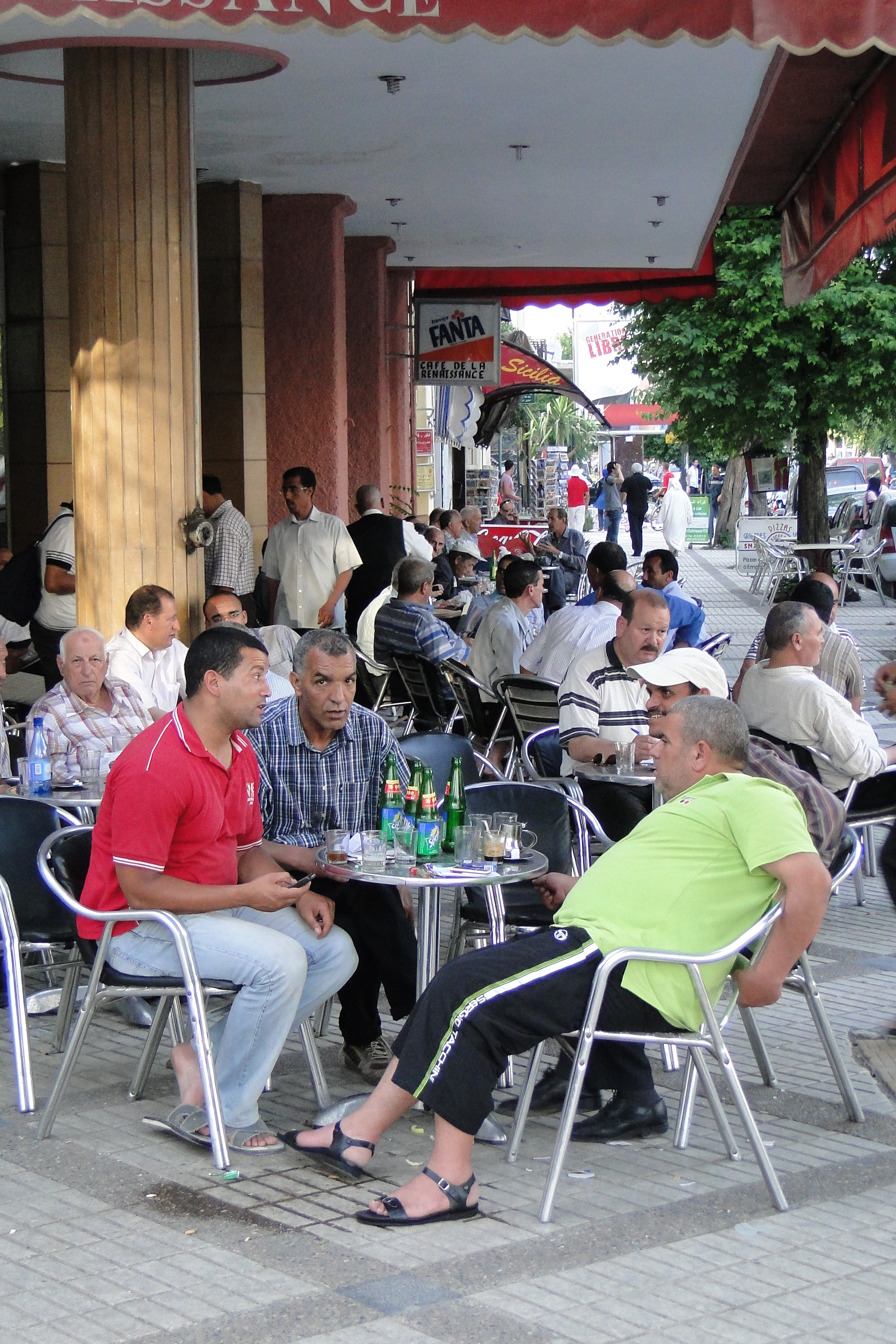
Men at a café, Fez

According to the 2024 national census, the population of the city of Fez was 1,256,172, which includes the municipalities of Fez proper and Méchouar Fès Jdid (New Fès). Most of the population was Moroccan, but it also included 3,832 resident foreigners. In the 2014 census, the foreigner population of Fez made up 4.2 percent of the total foreigner population of Morocco. The predominant religion in Fez is Islam. In the past the city had a large Jewish population, but as of 2001, less than 200 Jews remain.

=== Language ===
The official languages of Morocco are Modern Standard Arabic and Standard Moroccan Amazigh (Berber). The main spoken language in Fez is Moroccan Arabic, also known as Darija (Arabic: الدارجة المغربية, lit. 'Moroccan vernacular'), a vernacular variety of Arabic. Like the inhabitants of other historical urban centers in Morocco, Ahl Fes (أهل فاس "the people of Fes," referring especially to old elite families) speak their own distinct dialect of Darija. This Fessi dialect has traditionally been regarded as a prestige dialect over other forms of Moroccan Darija—particularly those seen as rural or 'arūbi (عروبي "of the rural Arabs")—due to its "association with the socio-economic power and dominance that its speakers enjoy at the national level," in the words of linguist Mohammed Errihani.

The Fessi dialect has traditionally had distinctive linguistic features. On the phonological level, these include the stereotypical use of a postalveolar approximant (like the American pronunciation of /ɹ/ in the word "red") in the place of a trilled [r] for /ر/, or a pharyngealized glottal stop or voiceless uvular plosive in the place of a voiced velar plosive ([g]) for /ق/. On the morphosyntactic level, gender distinction in pronouns and verb inflections is neutralized in the second person singular.

Many of these features were shared with the other "pre-Hilalian" dialects in the region. (Note: "Pre-Hilalian" in this context refers to dialects believed to descend from the Arabic spoken in the region prior to the arrival of the Banu Hilal and the Banu Ma'qil tribes that began in the 12th century. After this event, "Hilalian" dialects became dominant in the rural regions of central Morocco and are a major component of wider Moroccan Arabic today.) However, due to social and demographic changes that started in the 20th century such as mass rural migration into the city and the departure of most of the city's old urban elites to Casablanca, these old linguistic features are no longer dominant in the speech of Arabic speakers in Fez today. Prior to the departure of most Jewish residents in the second half of the 20th century, the Jewish community in Fez also spoke an Arabic dialect similar to the rest of the city. (Note: There are competing theories about the historical roots of Moroccan Jewish dialects of Arabic. Some scholars argue that they were strongly influenced by Andalusi Arabic dialects (which were similar to North African dialects) brought by Jewish refugees from Spain after 1492, while other scholars argue that these same refugees mostly spoke Judeo-Spanish when they arrived and eventually adopted existing Arabic dialects in the cities.)

The primary language of the literary traditions of Fes is Arabic. While the daily spoken language is Moroccan Arabic, spoken natively by 98.4% of the population of Fes province, many people also speak French fluently. English is increasingly being learned by younger generations. Berber dialects are also spoken by 1.2% of the province's population, mainly in the countryside around the city.

== Economy ==
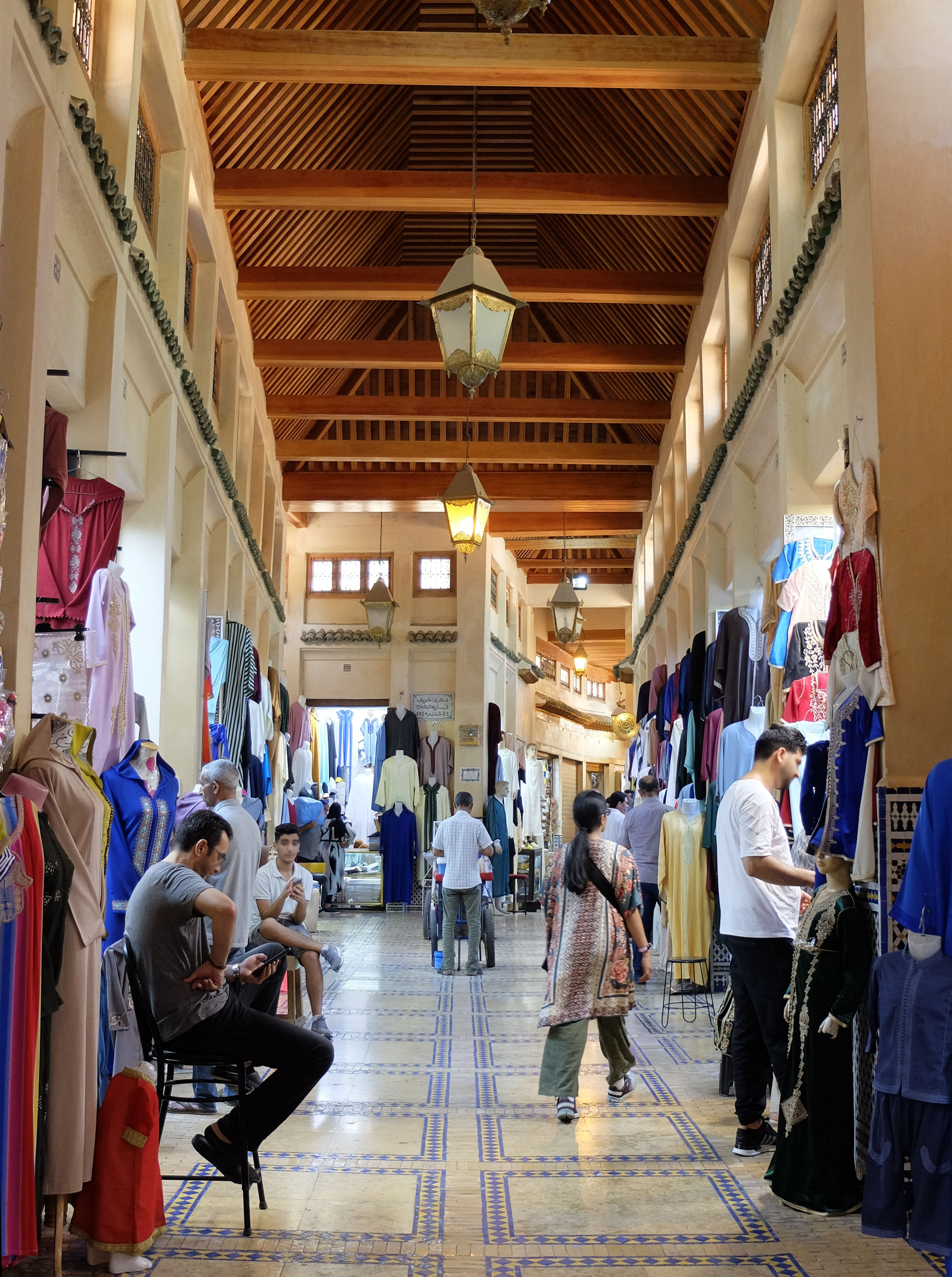
Street shops in the Kissariat al-Kifah, the central bazaar of the medina

Historically, the city was one of Morocco's main centers of trade and craftsmanship. The tanning industry, for example, still embodied by tanneries of Fes el-Bali today, was a major source of exports and economic sustenance since the city's early history. Up until the late 19th century, the city was the only place in the world which fabricated the fez hat. The city's commerce was concentrated along its major streets, like Tala'a Kebira, and around the central bazaar known as the Kissariat al-Kifah from which many other souqs (markets) branched off. The crafts industry continues to this day and is still focused in the old city, though largely reliant on tourism.

Today, the city's surrounding countryside, the fertile Saïss plains, is an important source of agricultural activity producing primarily cereals, beans, olives, and grapes, as well as raising livestock. Tourism is also a major industry due to the city's UNESCO-listed historic medina. Religious tourism is also present due to the old city's many major zawiyas (Islamic shrines), such as the Zawiya of Moulay Idris II and the Zawiya of Sidi Ahmed al-Tijani, which attract both Moroccan and international (especially West African) pilgrims. The city and the region still struggle with unemployment and economic precarity.

== Government ==
Two municipalities (Arabic: جماعتين حضريتين, French: communes) in the Fez Prefecture (Arabic: عمالة فاس) make up the city of Fez. Most of Fez is administered as the municipality of Fez, while the neighborhood of Fes Jdid is administered separately as the municipality of Méchouar Fès Jdid. Outside of the city, there are also three rural municipalities in the prefecture, Aïn Bida, Oulad Tayeb, and Sidi Harazem.

The municipality of Fez has an area of 94 square kilometres (36 sq mi) and recorded a population of 1,091,512 in the 2014 Moroccan census. It is divided into six arrondissements (مقاطعات):

Arrondissements of the municipality of Fez
Arrondissement	Area	Population (2014)	Population (2004)	Change	Population density (2014)
Agdal	21.0 km^{2} (8.1 sq mi)	142,407	144,064	−1.2%	6,781/km^{2} (17,560/sq mi)
El Mariniyine	13.5 km^{2} (5.2 sq mi)	209,494	191,093	+9.6%	15,520/km^{2} (40,190/sq mi)
Fès-Médina	2.2 km^{2} (0.85 sq mi)	70,592	91,473	−22.8%	32,100/km^{2} (83,100/sq mi)
Jnan El Ouard	16.3 km^{2} (6.3 sq mi)	201,011	174,226	+15.4%	12,330/km^{2} (31,940/sq mi)
Saiss	20.5 km^{2} (7.9 sq mi)	207,345	156,590	+32.4%	10,114/km^{2} (26,200/sq mi)
Zouagha	20.5 km^{2} (7.9 sq mi)	260,663	163,291	+59.6%	12,413/km^{2} (32,150/sq mi)

Northern wall of the Agdal Gardens

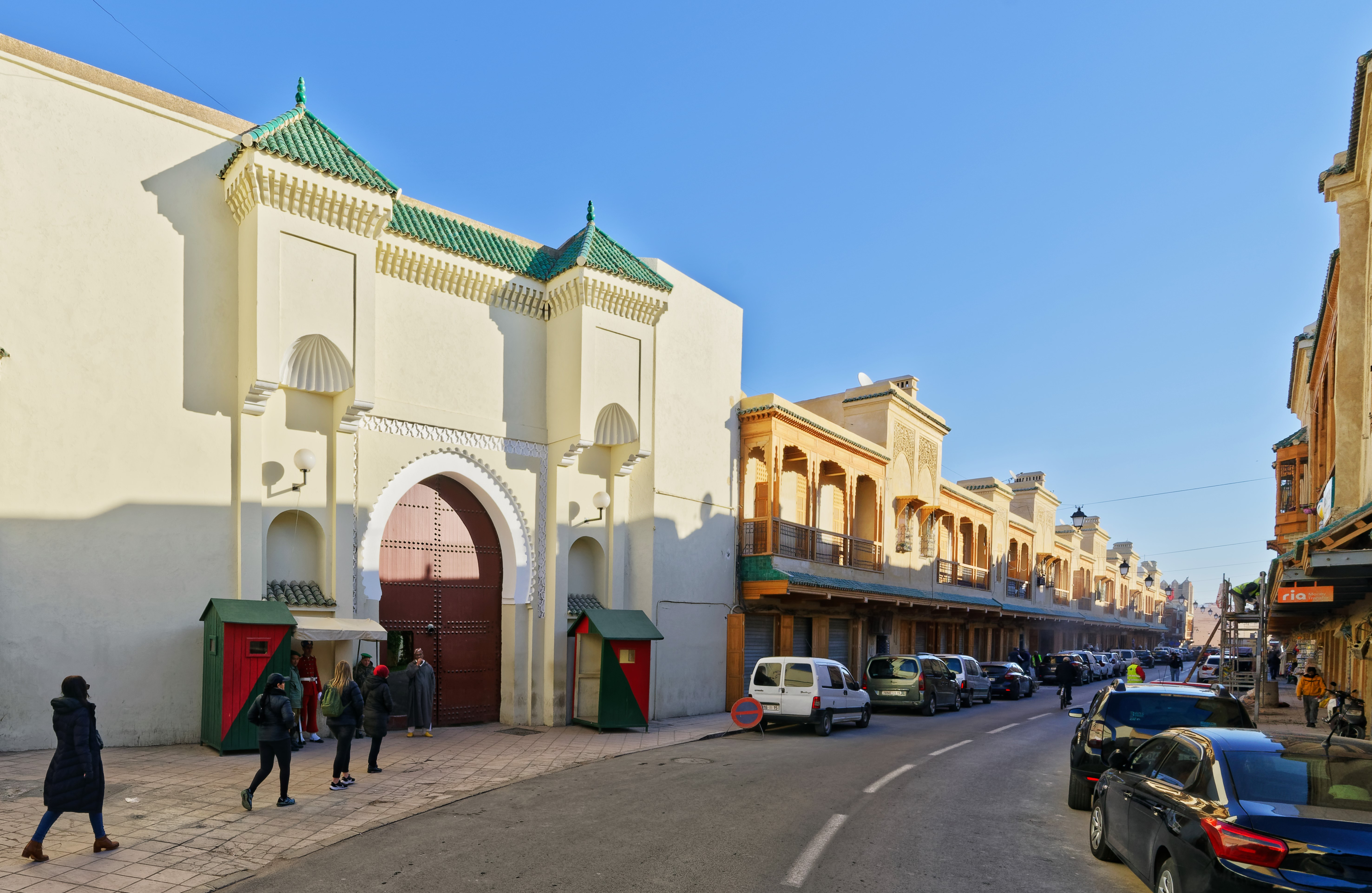
The Jewish Quarter in Fez

The municipality of Fez is governed by a 91-member council, elected by direct universal suffrage every six years. The arrondissements of Zouagha and Marininyine elect 17 councillors each; Jnan El Ouard and Saiss elect 16 councillors each; Agdal elects 13, and Fès-Médina elects 12. Executive power is wielded by a president and ten vice-presidents, which are elected by the council. In 2021, Abdeslam Bekkali, a member of the National Rally of Independents (RNI), succeeded Driss Azami El Idrissi as the new president of the municipality of Fez.

The municipality of Méchouar Fès Jdid consists of the neighborhood of Fes Jdid in the old city and forms an enclave within the municipality of Fez. Established in 1992, it is only 1.6 square kilometres (0.62 sq mi) in extent, and recorded a population of 20,560 in the 2014 census. The municipality possesses a special administrative status as the location of a royal palace (the Dar al-Makhzen or méchouar), one of four such municipalities (French: communes des méchouars) in Morocco. The other three are located in Casablanca, Marrakesh, and Rabat. These four municipalities are governed by special provisions that do not apply to ordinary municipalities.

The subdivisions of Fez Prefecture are grouped into two electoral districts, North Fez and South Fez, each of which elects four members to the House of Representatives. North Fez consists of the arrondissements of El Mariniyine, Fès-Médina, and Zouagha and the municipality of Méchouar Fès Jdid. South Fez consists of the other three arrondissements of Agdal, Jnan El Ouard, and Saiss, and the three rural municipalities outside the city of Fez.

== Landmarks ==
=== Medina of Fez ===
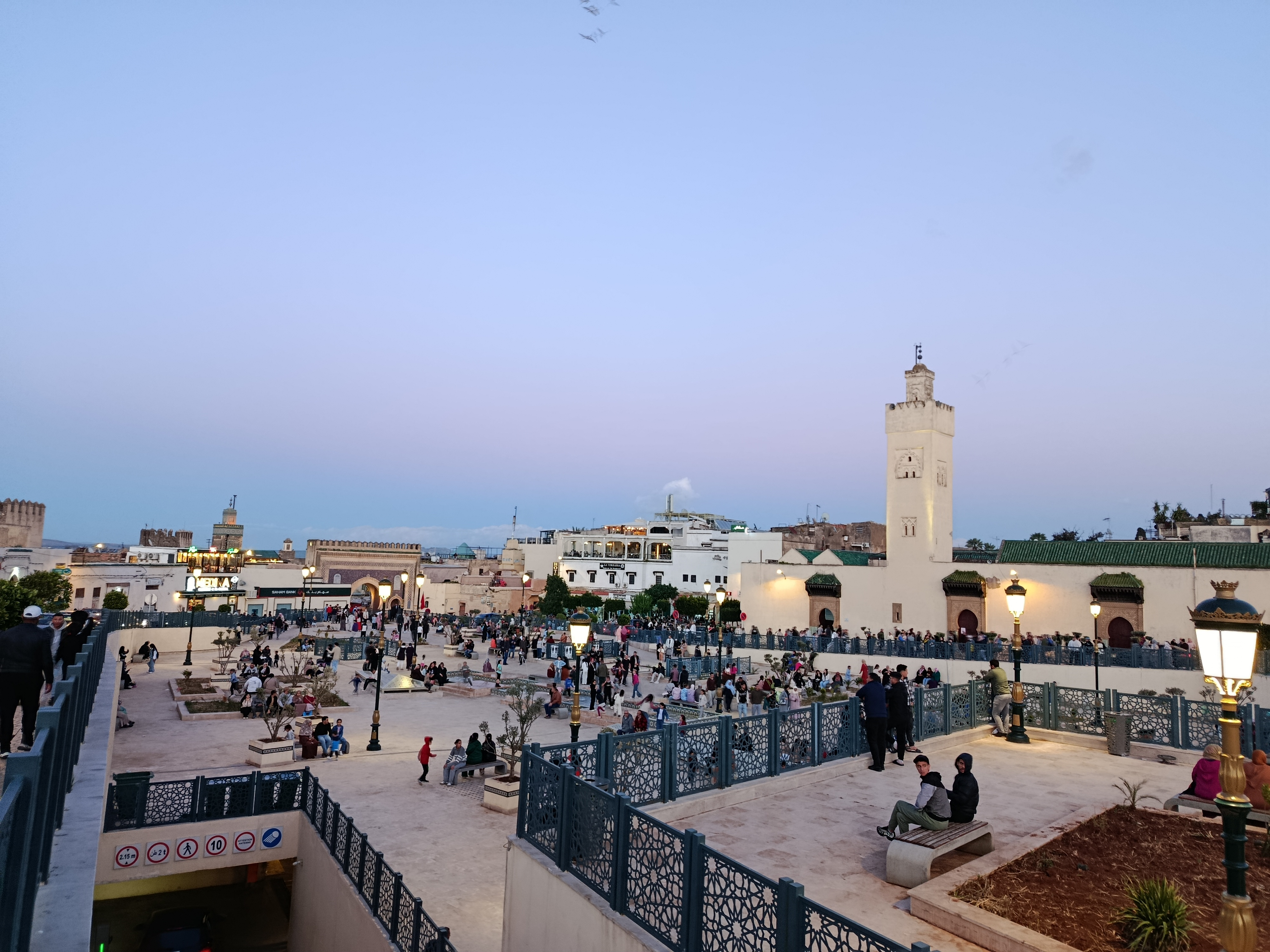
Boujloud Square and the garden adjacent to the Abi al-Junud Mosque

The historic city of Fez consists of Fes el-Bali, the original city on both shores of the Oued Fes (River of Fez), and the smaller Fez Jdid, founded on higher ground to the west in the 13th century. It is distinct from Fez's now much larger Ville Nouvelle (new city). Fes el-Bali is the oldest continuously inhabited walled city in the Arab world, and one of the largest and oldest urban pedestrian zones (car-free areas) in the whole world. It is the site of the famous Qarawiyyin University and the Zawiya of Moulay Idris II, the most important religious and cultural sites, while Fez el-Jdid is the site of the 195 acre Royal Palace, still used by the King of Morocco today. These two historic cities are linked together and are usually referred to together as the "medina" of Fez, though this term is sometimes applied more restrictively to Fes el-Bali only. (Note: Medina is the Arabic word for "city", which in former French colonies in North Africa is also used to refer to the old part of a city, as the French largely generally built new cities (Ville Nouvelles) next to them and left the historic cities intact.)

Fez is becoming an increasingly popular tourist destination and many non-Moroccans are now restoring traditional houses (riads and dars) as second homes in the medina. In 1981, the United Nations Educational, Scientific and Cultural Organization (UNESCO) designated Medina of Fez a World Heritage Site, describing it as "one of the most extensive and best conserved historic towns of the Arab-Muslim world." It was the first site in Morocco to be granted this status.

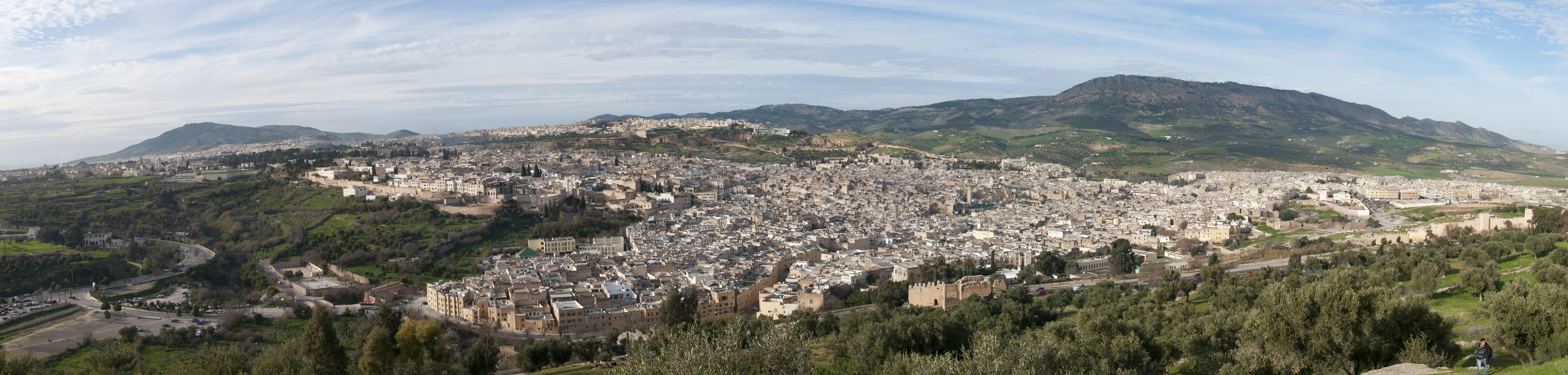
Panoramic view of Fes el-Bali

=== Places of worship ===
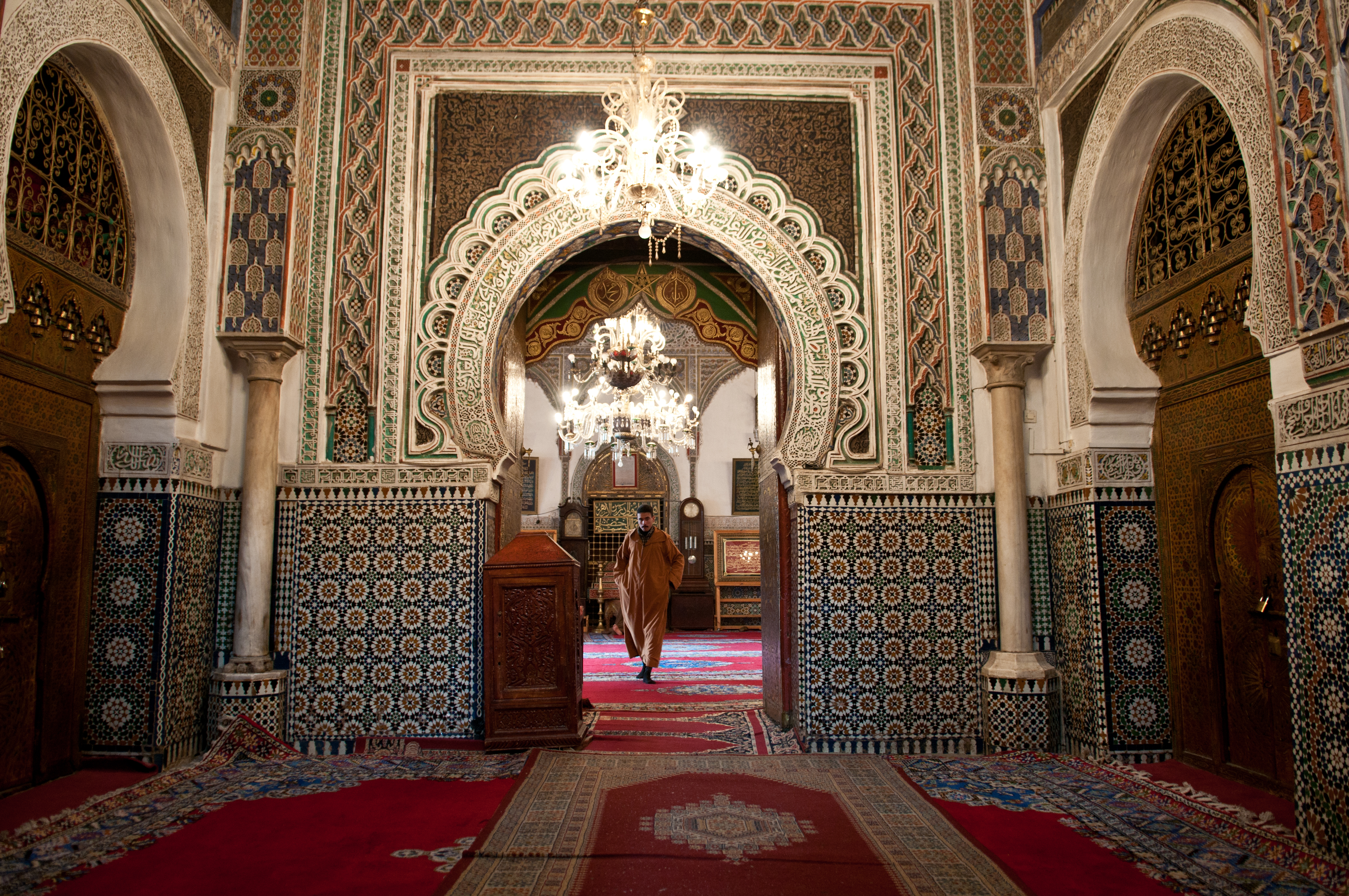
Interior of the Zawiya of Moulay Idris II in Fes el-Bali

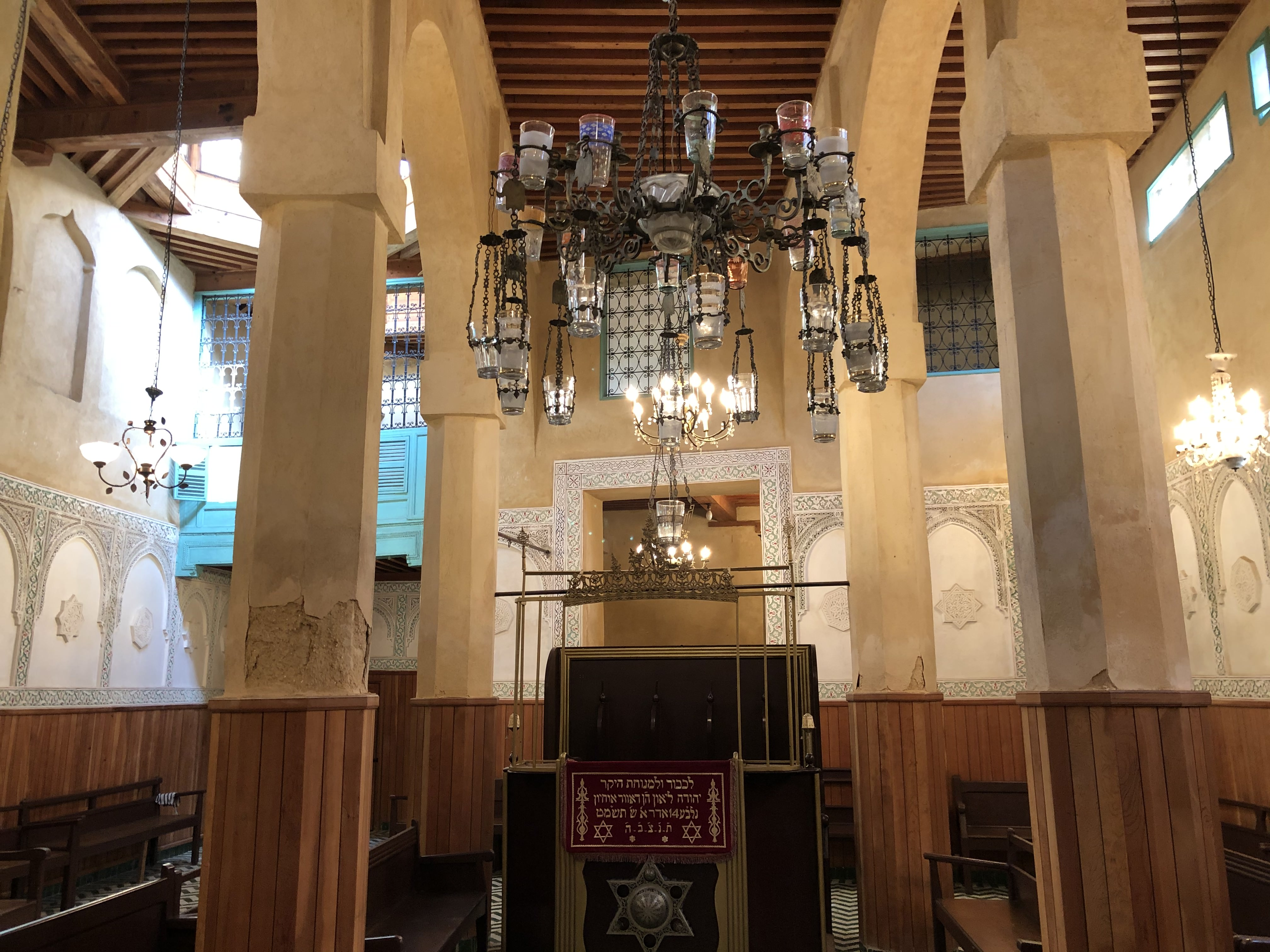
Interior of the Al-Fassiyin Synagogue in the Mellah

There are numerous historic mosques in the medina, some of which are part of a madrasa or zawiya. Among the oldest still standing today are the Mosque of al-Qarawiyyin, founded in 857 and subsequently expanded, the Mosque of the Andalusians founded in 859–860, the Bou Jeloud Mosque from the late 12th century, and possibly the Mosque of the Kasbah en-Nouar (which may have existed in the Almohad period but was likely rebuilt much later). The very oldest mosques of the city, dating back to its first years, were the Mosque of the Sharifs (or Shurafa Mosque) and the Mosque of the Sheikhs (or al-Anouar Mosque); however, they no longer exist in their original form. The Mosque of the Sharifs was the burial site of Idris II and evolved into the Zawiya of Moulay Idris II that exists today, while the al-Anouar Mosque has left only minor remnants.

A number of mosques from the important Marinid era, when Fes Jdid was created to be the capital of Morocco, include the Great Mosque of Fez el-Jdid from 1276, the Abu al-Hasan Mosque from 1341, the Chrabliyine Mosque from 1342, and the al-Hamra Mosque from around the same period. The Bab Guissa Mosque was also founded in the reign of Abu al-Hasan (1331–1351), but modified in later centuries. Other major mosques from the more recent 'Alawi period are the Moulay Abdallah Mosque, built in the early to mid-18th century with the tomb of Sultan Moulay Abdallah, and the R'cif Mosque, built in the reign of Moulay Slimane (1793–1822). The Zawiya of Moulay Idris II and the Zawiya of Sidi Ahmed al-Tijani include mosque areas as well, as do several other prominent zawiyas in the city. The Ville Nouvelle also includes many modern mosques, the largest of which is the Imam Malik Mosque which opened in 1994.

Elsewhere, the Jewish quarter (Mellah) is the site of the 17th-century Al-Fassiyin Synagogue and Ibn Danan Synagogue, as well multiple other lesser-known synagogues, though none of them are functioning today. According to the World Jewish Congress there are only 150 Moroccan Jews remaining in Fes. The Church of Saint Francis of Assisi, the only Catholic church in Fez, was established in 1919 or 1920, during the French colonial period. The current building was constructed in 1928 and expanded in 1933. Today it is part of the Archdiocese of Rabat, and it was most recently restored in 2005.

=== Madrasas ===
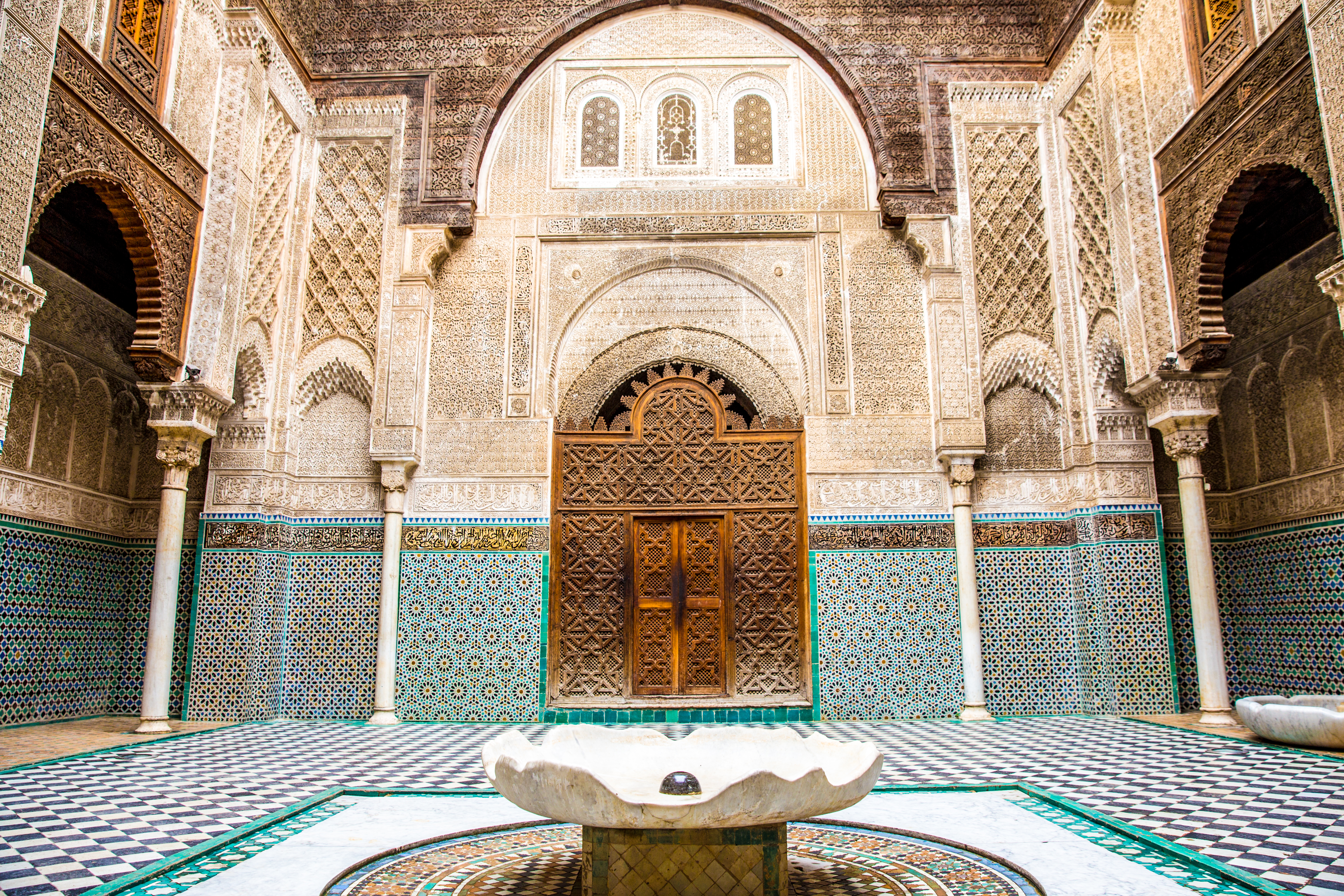
Al-Attarine Madrasa built in 1323–1325 in Fes el-Bali

The al-Qarawiyyin was established in 857 by Fatima al-Fihri, originally as a mosque, now a university. It is the oldest existing and continually operating degree-awarding educational institution in the world according to UNESCO and Guinness World Records. The Marinid dynasty devoted great attention to the construction of madrasas following the Maliki school, resulting in the unprecedented prosperity of the city's religious institutions. The first madrasa built during the Marinid era was the Saffarin Madrasa in Fes el-Bali by Sultan Abu Yusuf in 1271. Sultan Abu al-Hasan was the most prolific patron of madrasa construction, completing the Al-Attarine, Mesbahiyya and Sahrij Madrasas. His son Abu Inan Faris built the Bou Inania Madrasa, and by the time of his death, every major city in the Marinid Empire had at least one madrasa. The library of al-Qarawiyyin, which holds a large collection of manuscripts from the medieval era, was also established under Marinid rule around 1350. It is widely believed to be the oldest library in the world that is still open. The largest madrasa in the medina is Cherratine Madrasa, which was commissioned by the 'Alawi sultan Al-Rashid in 1670 and is the only major non-Marinid foundation besides the Madrasa of al-Qarawiyyin.

=== Tombs and mausoleums ===
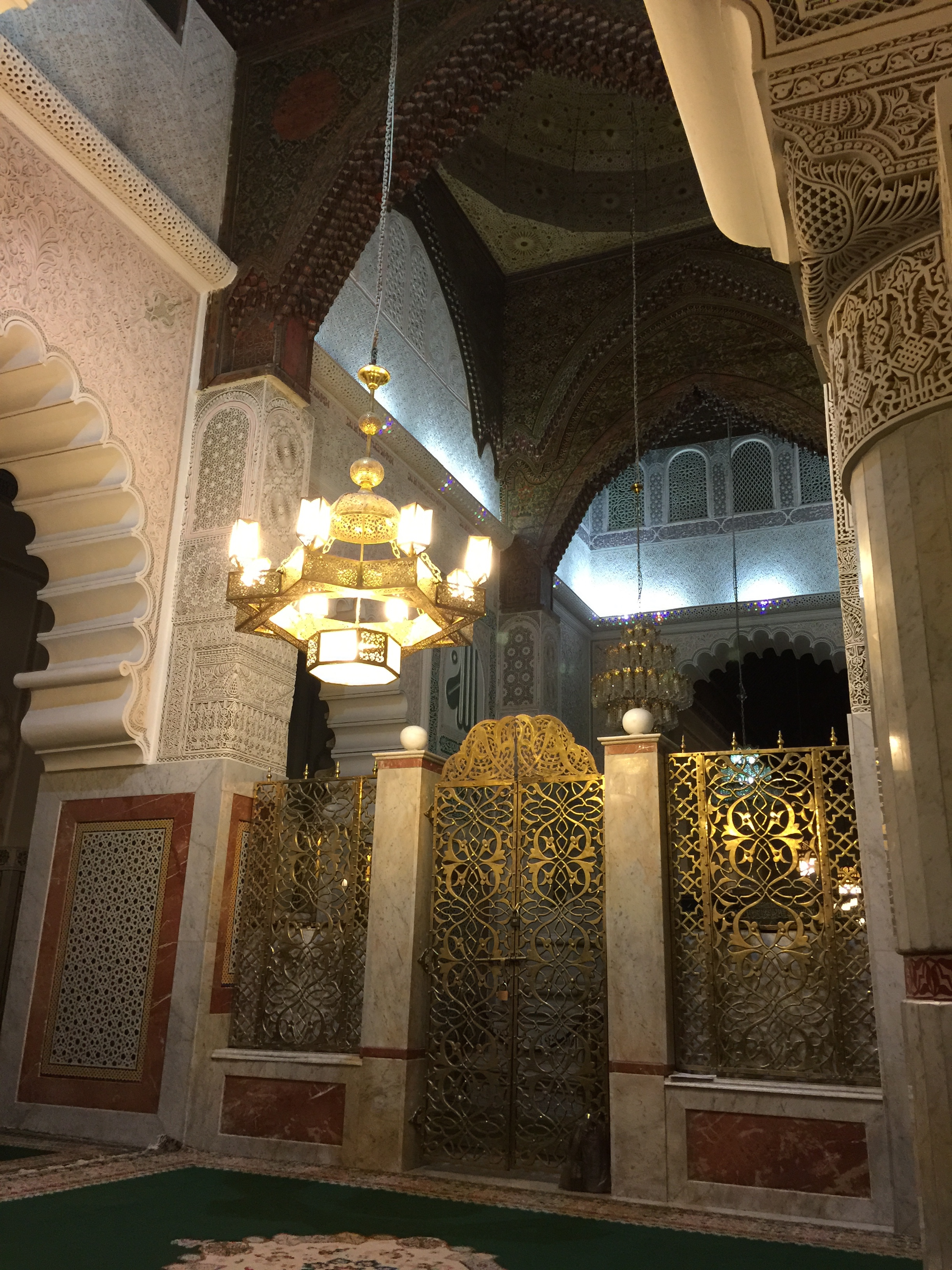
Interior of the mausoleum of Ahmad al-Tijani (d. 1815) in the Zawiya of Sidi Ahmed al-Tijani in Fes el-Bali

Located in the heart of Fes el-Bali, the Zawiya of Moulay Idris II is a zawiya (a shrine and religious complex; also spelled zaouia), dedicated to and containing the tomb of Idris II (or Moulay Idris II when including his sharifian title) who is considered the main founder of the city of Fez. Another well-known and important zawiya is the Zawiyia of Sidi Ahmed al-Tijani, which commemorates Sidi Ahmed al-Tijani, the founder of Tijaniyyah tariqa from the 18th century. A number of zawiyas are scattered elsewhere across the city, many containing the tombs of important Sufi saints or scholars, such as the Zawiya of Sidi Abdelkader al-Fassi, the Zawiya of Sidi Ahmed esh-Shawi, and the Zawiya of Sidi Taoudi Ben Souda.

The old city contains several major historic cemeteries which stand outside the walls of Fes el-Bali, namely the cemeteries of Bab Ftouh (the most significant), Bab Mahrouk, and Bab Guissa. Some include marabouts or domed structures, containing the tombs of local Muslim saints (often considered Sufis), for example the Marabout of Sidi Harazem in the Bab Ftouh Cemetery. The ruins of the Marinid Tombs, built during the 14th century as a necropolis for the Marinid sultans, are close to the Bab Guissa Cemetery.

=== Fortifications ===
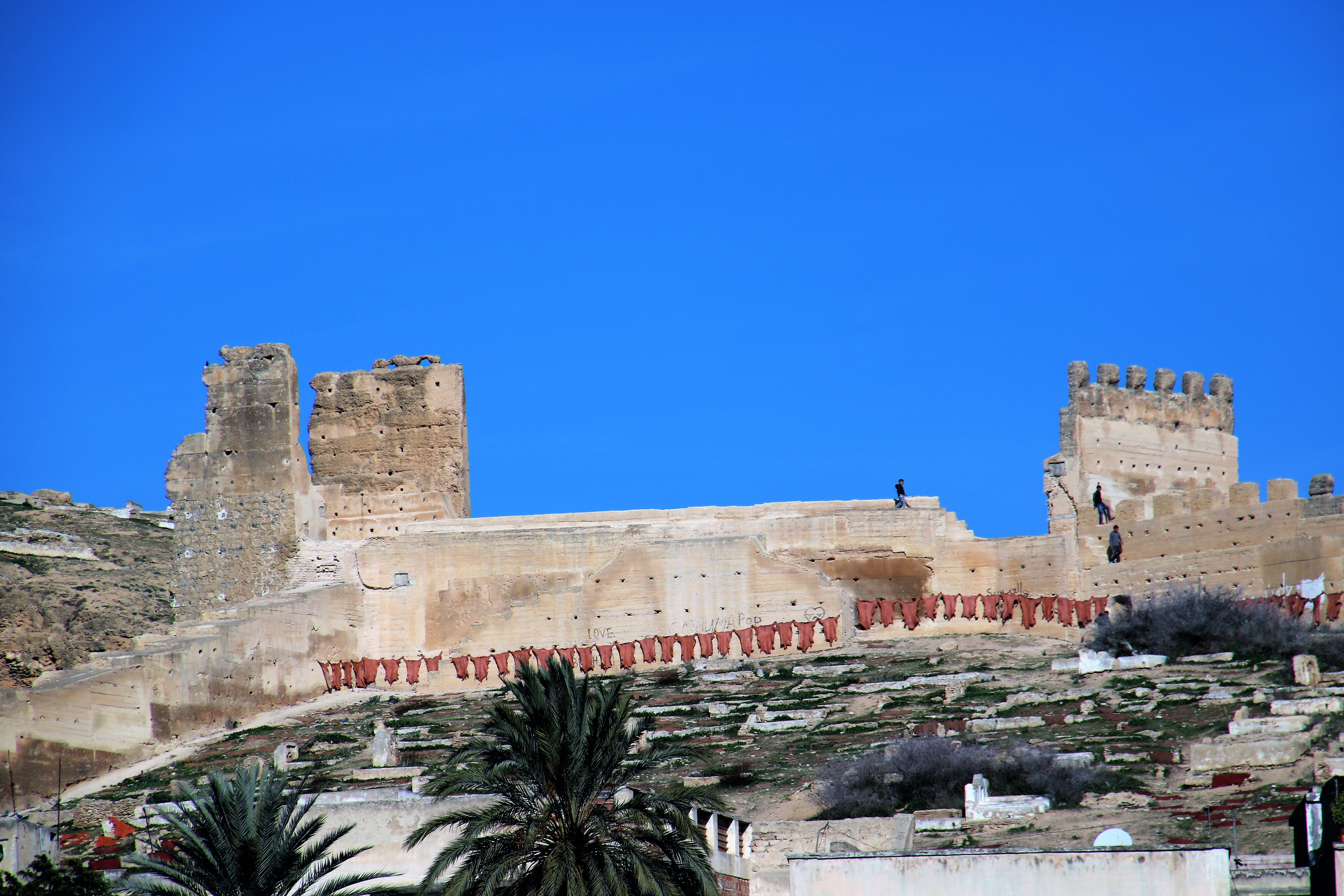
City walls of Fez (northern section).

The entire medina of Fez was heavily fortified with crenelated walls with watchtowers and gates, a pattern of urban planning which can be seen in Salé and Chellah as well. The oldest sections of the walls today, on the north side of Fes el-Bali, date back to the Almohad period. The gates of Fez, scattered along the circuit of walls, were guarded by the military detachments and shut at night. Some of the main gates have existed, in different forms, since the earliest years of the city. The oldest gates today, and historically the most important ones of Fes el-Bali, are Bab Mahrouk (in the west), Bab Guissa (in the northeast), and Bab Ftouh (in the southeast). The main gates of Fes Jdid include Bab Dekkakin, Bab Semmarine, and Bab al-Amer. In modern times, the function of gates became more ceremonial rather than defensive, as reflected by the 1913 construction of the decorative Bab Bou Jeloud gate at the western entrance of Fes el-Bali by the French colonial administration.

Several forts were constructed along the defensive perimeters of the medina during different time periods. A "kasbah" in the context of the Maghreb region is the traditional military structure for fortification, military preparation, command and control. Some of them were occupied as well by citizens, certain tribal groups, and merchants. Throughout the city's history, 13 kasbahs were constructed. Among them is the Kasbah an-Nouar, the Kasbah Tamdert, and the Kasbah Cherarda. The Saadis also built a number of bastions and forts in the late 16th century including Borj Nord and its sister fort, Borj Sud.

=== Tanneries ===
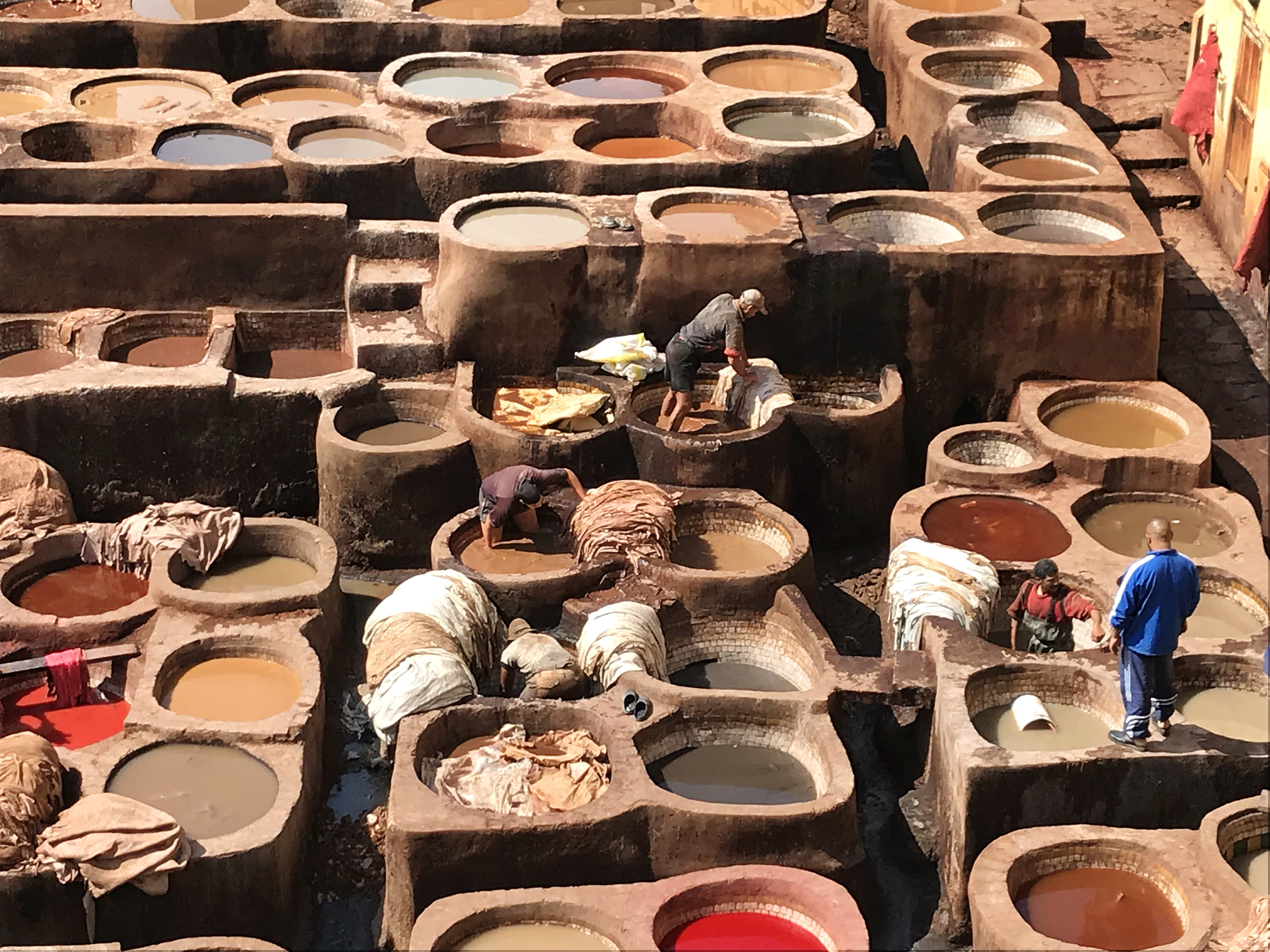
Leather tanning in Chouara Tannery

Since the city's foundation, the tanning industry has been continually operating in Fez and is considered one of the main tourist attractions. There are three tanneries in the city, largest among them is Chouara Tannery near the Saffarin Madrasa along the river. The tanneries are packed with the round stone wells filled with dye or white liquids for softening the hides. The leather goods produced in the tanneries are exported around the world. The two other major tanneries are the Sidi Moussa Tannery to the west of the Zawiya of Moulay Idris II and the Ain Azliten Tannery in the neighbourhood of the same name on the northern edge of Fes el-Bali.

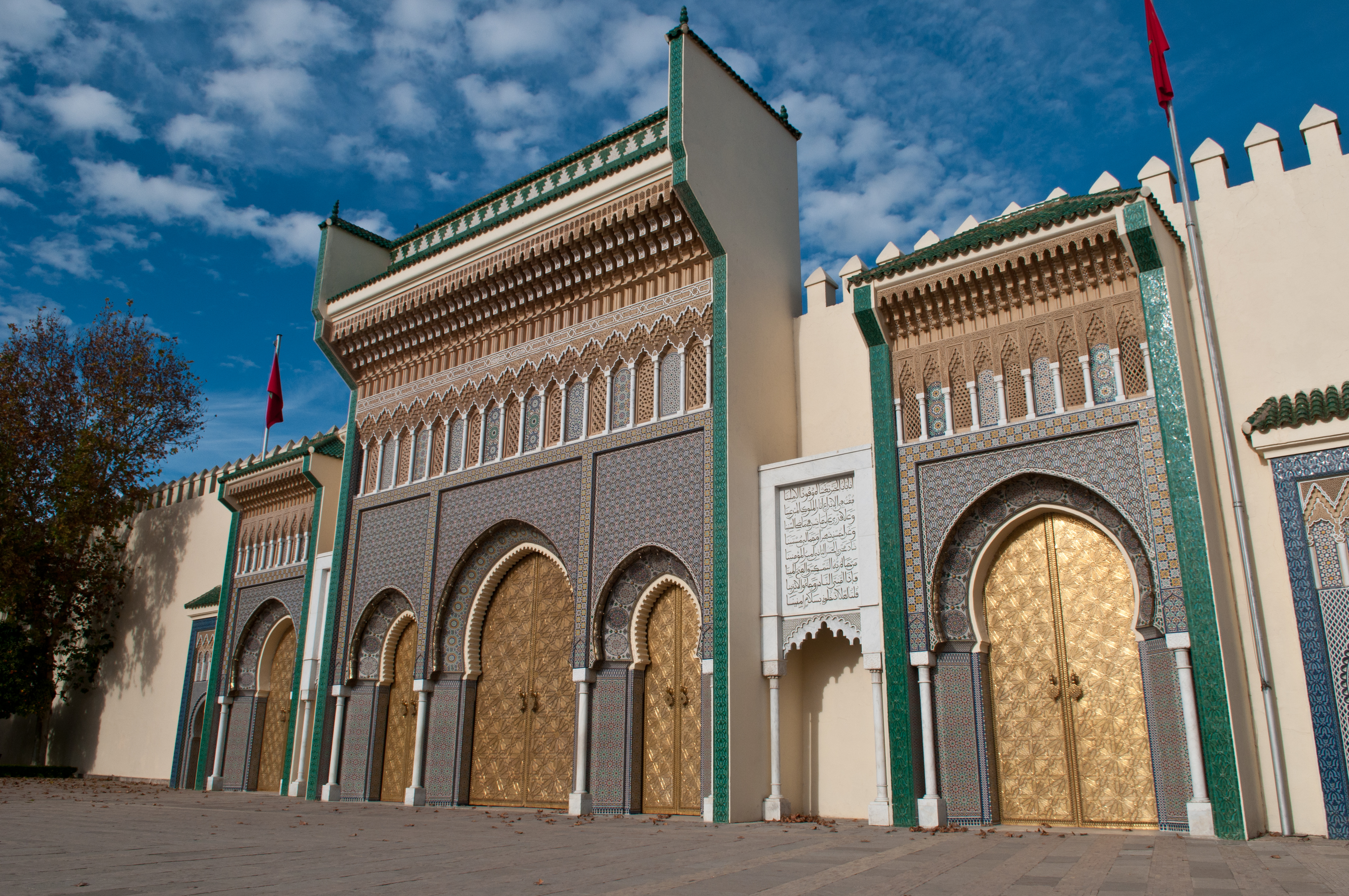
Gates of the 'Alawi Royal Palace (Dar al-Makhzen)

=== Historic palaces and residences ===
Many old private residences have also survived to this day, in various states of conservation. The typical traditional house (dar) is centered around an internal courtyard. Some of these houses also had internal gardens known as a riad. Such private houses include the Dar al-Alami, the Dar Saada (now a restaurant), Dar 'Adiyil, Dar Belghazi, and others. Larger and richer mansions, such as the Dar Mnebhi, Dar Moqri, and Jamai Palace, have also been preserved. Numerous traditional houses, popularly known as "riads", are now utilized as hotels for the tourism industry. The Jamai Palace was converted into a luxury hotel, known as Palais Jamaï, in the early 20th century. The lavish former mansion of the Glaoui clan, known as the Dar Glaoui, is partly open to visitors but still privately owned.

As a former capital, the city contains several royal palaces as well. Dar Batha is a former palace completed by the 'Alawi Sultan Abdelaziz. In 1915 it was turned into a museum of historical art and artifacts, containing around 6,000 pieces. A large area of Fes Jdid is also taken up by the 80-hectare Royal Palace, or Dar al-Makhzen. Its ornate gates built in 1969–71 are the main feature visible to the public. Its grounds are not open to the public, as they are still used by the King of Morocco when visiting the city.

=== Gardens ===
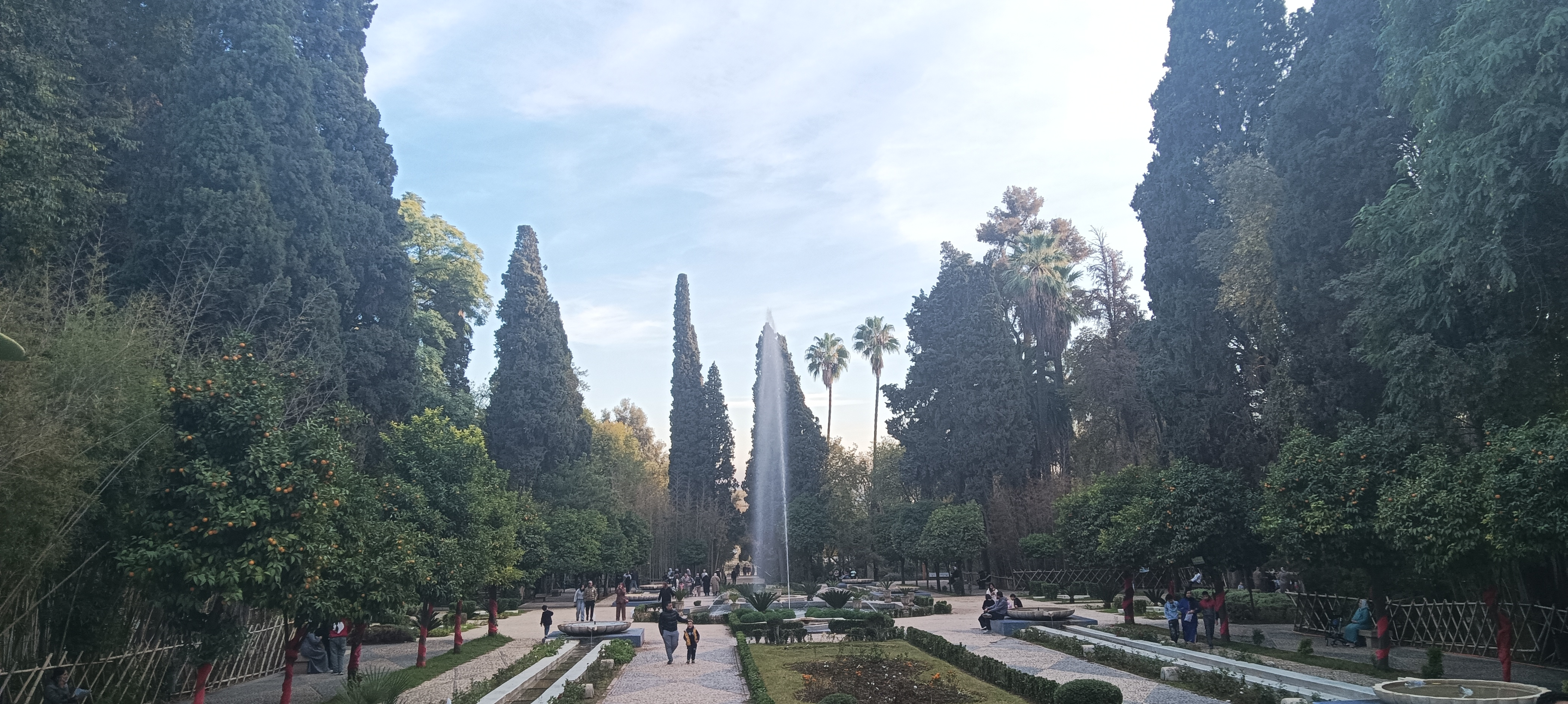
Jnan Sbil, a public garden near Fes Jdid

The Jnan Sbil Garden, between Fes Jdid and Fes el-Bali, is the oldest surviving garden in Fez and was created as a royal park and garden in the 19th century by Sultan Moulay Hassan I. Many bourgeois and aristocratic mansions also had private gardens, especially in the southwestern part of Fes el-Bali. Other gardens also exist within the grounds of the historic royal palaces of the city, such as the Agdal and Lalla Mina Gardens in the Royal Palace or the gardens of the Dar el-Beida (originally attached to Dar Batha).

=== Funduqs (historic merchant buildings) ===
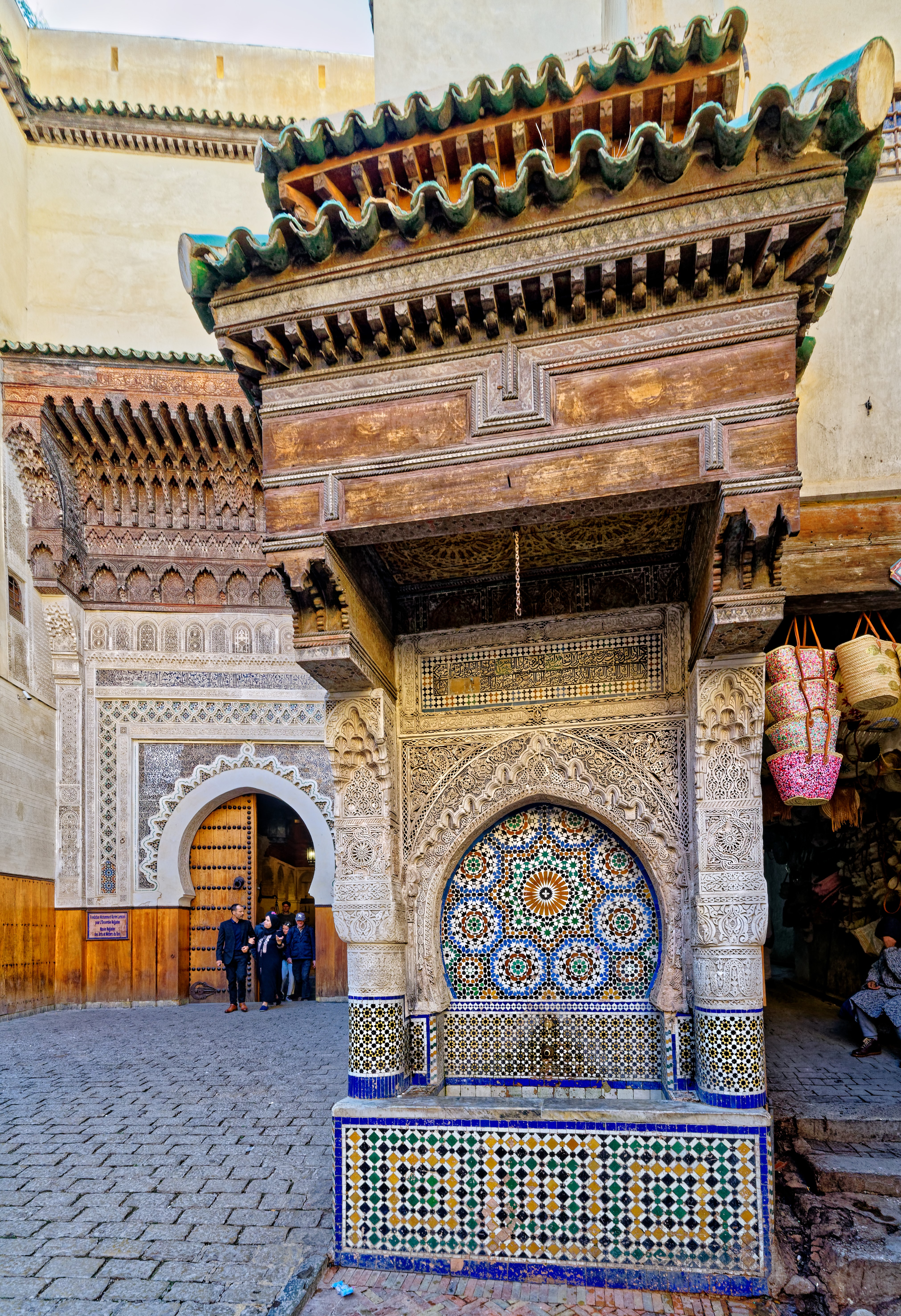
Funduq al-Najjarin in Fes el Bali.

The old city of Fez includes more than a hundred funduqs or foundouks (traditional inns, or urban caravanserais). These commercial buildings housed the workshops of artisans or provided lodging for merchants and travelers. They also frequently served as venues for other commercial activities such as markets and auctions. The Funduq al-Najjarin was built in the 18th century by Amin Adiyil to provide accommodation and storage for merchants and now houses the Nejjarine Museum of Wooden Arts & Crafts. Other major important examples include the Funduq Shamma'in (also spelled Foundouk Chemmaïne) and the Funduq Staouniyyin (or Funduq of the Tetouanis), both dating from the Marinid era or earlier, and the Funduq Sagha which is contemporary with the Funduq al-Najjariyyin.

=== Hammams (bathhouses) ===
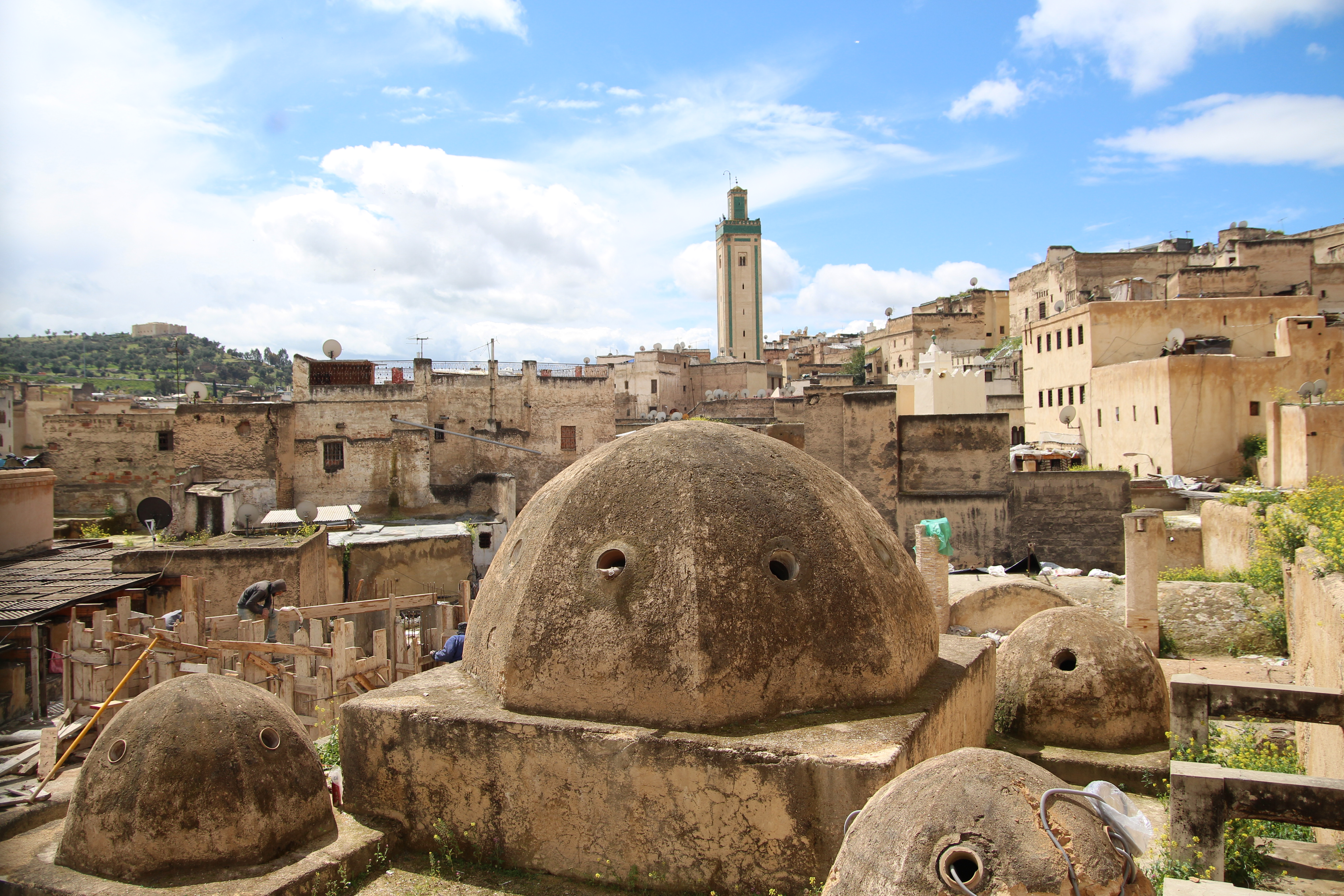
Rooftop view of the domes of the Saffarin Hammam, located at Place Seffarine

Fez has preserved many of its historic hammams (public bathhouses in the Muslim world) which continue to be used by local people. Examples, all dating from around the 14th century, include the Hammam as-Saffarin, the Hammam al-Mokhfiya, and the Hammam Ben Abbad. They were generally built next to a well or natural spring which provided water, while the sloping topography of the city allowed for easy drainage. The layout of the traditional hammam in the region was inherited from the Roman bathhouse model, consisting of a changing room, a cold room, a warm room, and a hot room. Though their architecture can be very functional, some of them, like the Hammam as-Saffarin and the Hammam al-Mokhfiya, feature more decoration. The hammams are identifiable from the exterior by the domes and vaults above their main chambers.

=== Ville Nouvelle ===
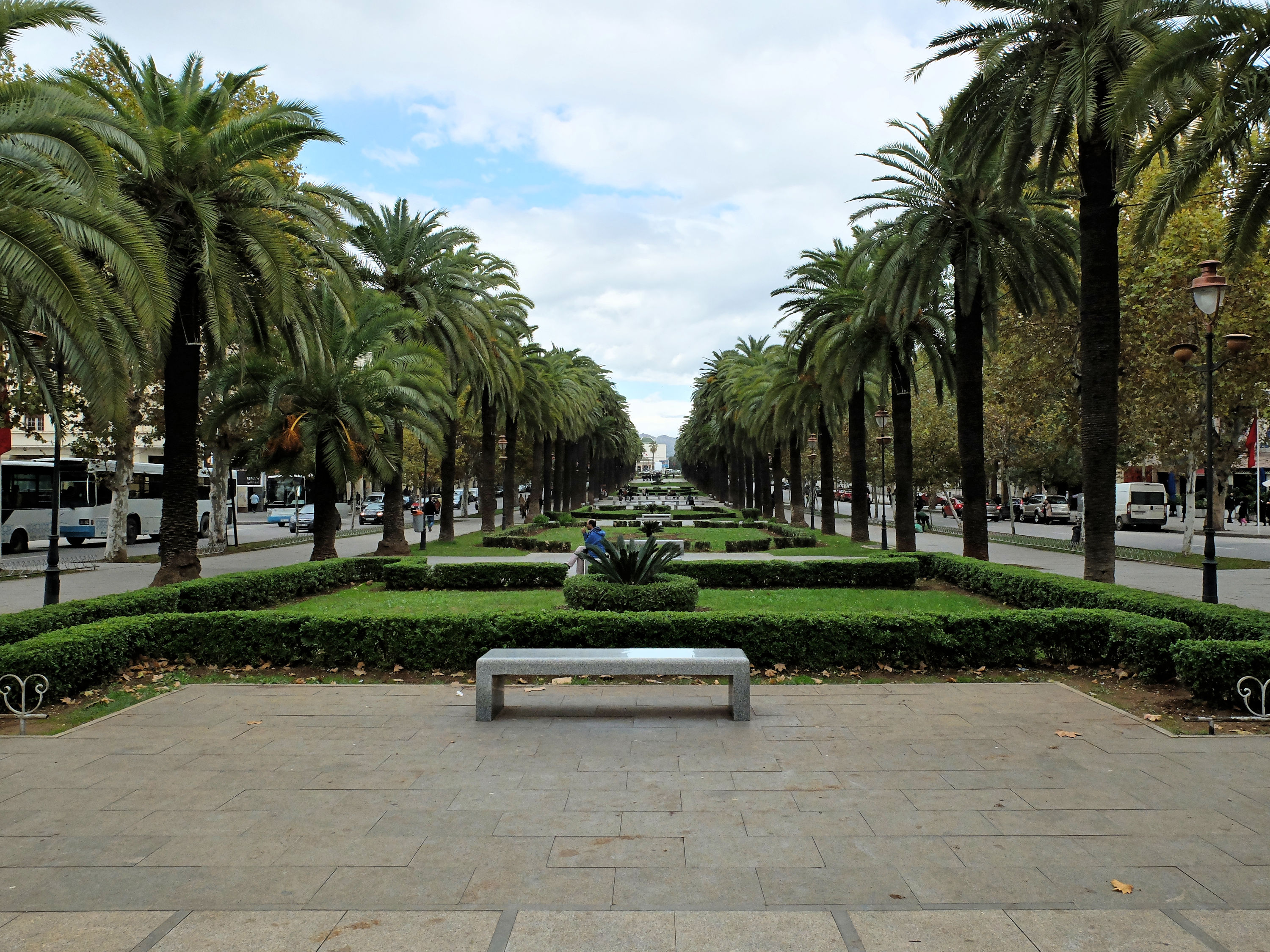
Avenue Hassan II in the Ville Nouvelle (New City)

The Ville Nouvelle is centered around Avenue Hassan II, a wide street laid out by the French colonial administration after 1912 and known then as Avenue de France. A tree-lined park area runs along its middle between the lanes for car traffic. At the avenue's northeastern end is Place de la Résistance (originally called Place Gambetta), a large roundabout with a fountain at its center. Further south along the same avenue is Place Florence (originally Place Lyautey), a wide plaza planted with trees and originally designed as a public garden. At the southwest end of the avenue is Place Ahmed El Mansour (originally Place Galliéni).

During the colonial period the main public buildings of the city were erected along and around this main avenue. Buildings from this period were constructed in a mix of mauresque (neo-Moorish or Moroccan), Art Deco, and Neoclassical styles. On the south side of Place Florence is the Bank al-Maghrib building, built between 1928 and 1931 by architect René Canu. Nearby, on the east side of Avenue Hassan II, is the Central Post Office building. The first post office here was built in 1925 and 1927 by architect Edmond Pauty, but it was rebuilt and expanded in its current form by architect Emile Toulon in 1946–1947. The Court of Appeals building, located southwest of the post office, was constructed in 1934–1936 by architects Adrien Laforgue and Antoine Marchisio and it originally housed the Court of First Instance (Tribunal de première instance).

== Culture ==
Fez is considered the spiritual and cultural heart of Morocco. It is often called the "Mecca of the West" and the "Athens of Africa."

=== Literature ===
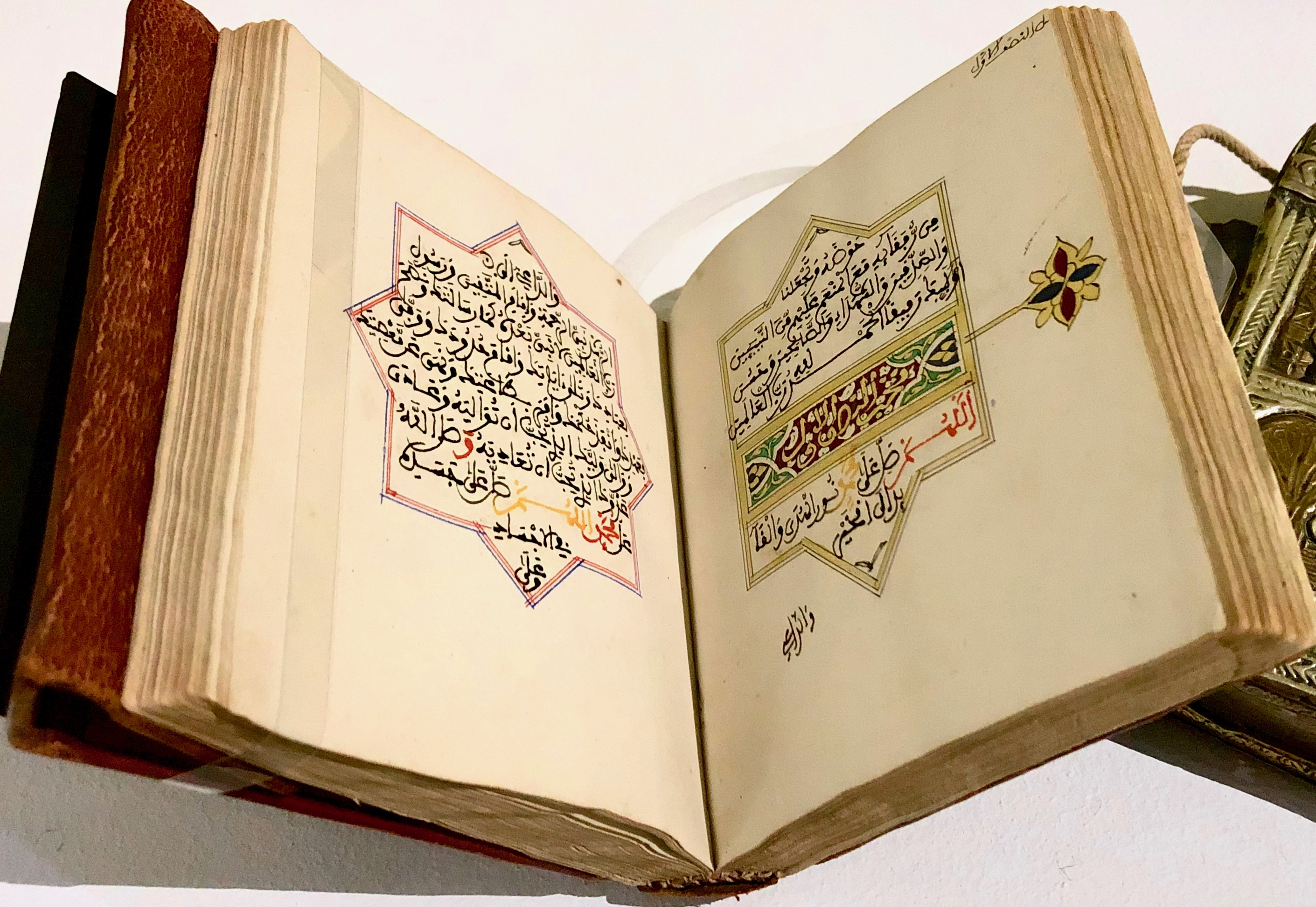
A copy of Muhammad al-Jazuli's Sufi text Dala'il al-Khayrat, a book of prayers first written in Fes in the 15th century

Up until the 19th century, the al-Qarawiyyin dominated the intellectual life of the city and of the country around it. Literature was focused on religious scholarship, philosophy, and poetry. The city's largest library was located at the Qarawiyyin Mosque, while others were attached to other major mosques. Under Sultan Abd al-Rahman (r. 1822–1859) a new library was created inside the Royal Palace and later in the 19th century the city's wealthy elites began creating their own privates libraries.

The city is also one of the historical centers of Moroccan Sufism and a significant body of written works were devoted to its many Sufi walis ("saints" or teachers). This type of literature established itself as one of the main literary genres of Morocco by the late 14th century and Sufi written works from Fez are especially abundant from the 17th to 20th centuries. A study by Ruggero Vimercati Sanseverino describes the rise of the Zawiya al-Fasiyya, a Sufi order founded in 1581 by Abu l-Mahasin Yusuf al-Fasi, as the impetus for the development of a tradition of Sufi literature particular to Fez. This literature was a diverse mix of hagiographies (religious biographies), genealogies, and historiographies whose conventions evolved over time. Writers sought to establish a continuity between the teachings of contemporary Sufi masters and those that came before them, with the city of Fez portrayed as the center of this spiritual heritage.

Towards the beginning of the 20th century Moroccan literature began to diversify, with polemic or political works becoming more common at this time. For example, there were Muhammad Bin Abdul-Kabir Al-Kattani's anti-colonial periodical at-Tā'ūn (الطاعون The Plague), and his uncle Muhammad ibn Jaqfar al-Kattani's popular Nasihat ahl al-Islam ("Advice to the People of Islam"), published in Fez in 1908, both of which called on Moroccans to unite against European encroachment.

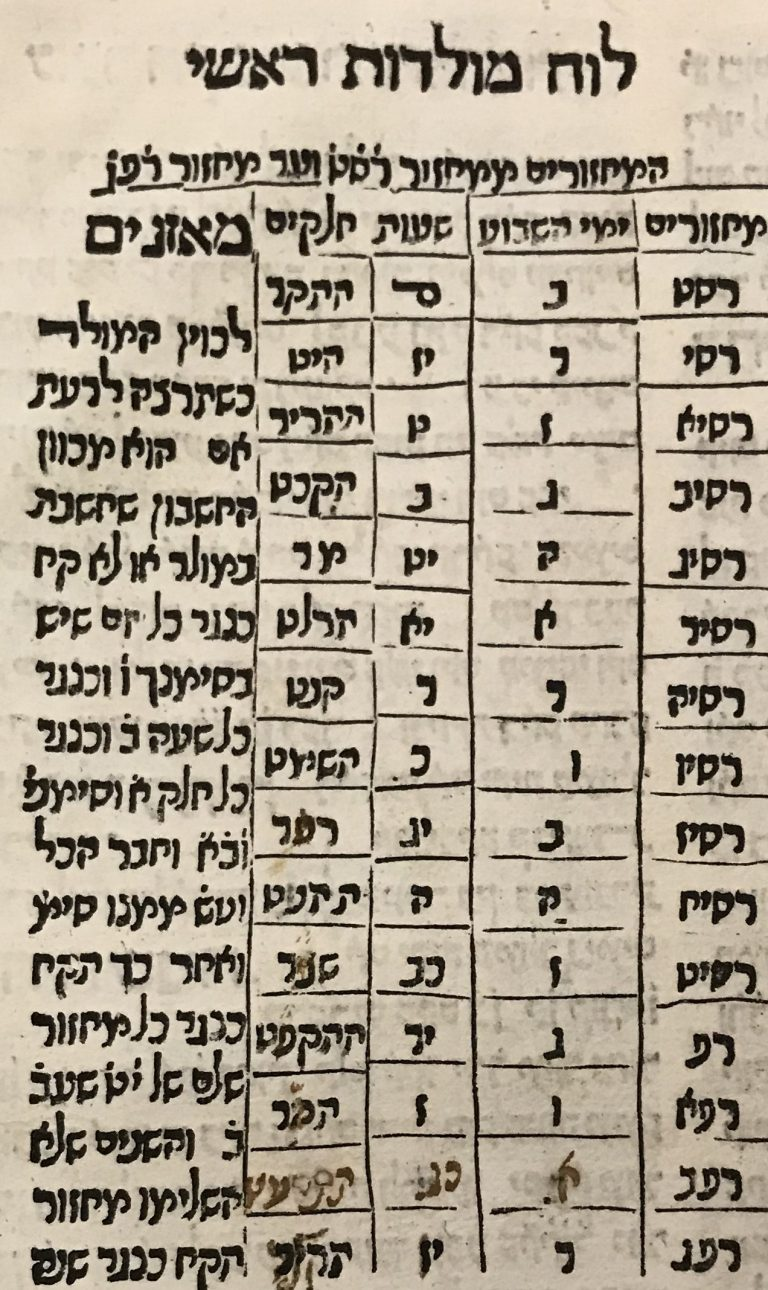
Table of calculations from a copy of the Sefer Abudraham printed in Fez in 1516, the first book printed in Africa

Fez, along with Cordoba, was one of the centers of a Jewish intellectual and cultural renaissance that took place in the 10th and 11th centuries in Morocco and al-Andalus. Jewish literary figures associated with Fez include the poet Dunash Ben Labrat (d. c. 990), the grammarian Judah ben David Hayyuj (d. c. 1012), the Talmudist Isaac al-Fasi (d. 1103), and the scholar Joseph ben Judah ibn Aknin (d. c. 1220), who were all born in Fez or spent time there. Maimonides (d. 1204), one of the most important Jewish intellectuals of his era, also lived in Fez from 1159 to 1165 after fleeing al-Andalus. The first book printed on the African continent was printed in Fez. A copy of Sefer Abudarham (ספר אבודרהם) was printed in Hebrew in 1516 by Samuel ben Isaac Nedivot and his son, who were Jewish refugees from Lisbon. The press was short-lived and printed 15 copies, one of which is now preserved at the Library of Congress.

Printing in Arabic was introduced to Morocco in 1864–65, on the initiative of a man named Muhammad at-Tayyib ar-Rudani, an Islamic scholar and judge originally from the Sous region. In 1864 Ar-Rudani, while returning from his Hajj pilgrimage, bought an Arabic printing press in Cairo and contracted an Egyptian operator, bringing both back with him to Morocco. The press appears to have been confiscated by the Moroccan authorities when it arrived at port and sent to Meknes, where Sultan Muhammad IV was residing at the time. The first book in Arabic was thus printed in Meknes in June 1865, before the press was moved again to Fez in that same year, where it continued to operate until the 1940s. The press was installed in a central neighbourhood of Fes el-Bali and was managed by the government, which printed traditional scholarly books and made some of the productions available to the Qarawiyyin University free of charge. After 1871 the government transferred management of the press to private citizens and the applications of printing widened. After 1897 it became a regulated industry overseen by officials in Fez. By 1908 there were at least four printing establishments in Fez, while two other Moroccan printers were in Tangier. Hebrew printing presses were reintroduced to Morocco in the 1890s in Tangier and were more firmly established across the country in the 1920s.

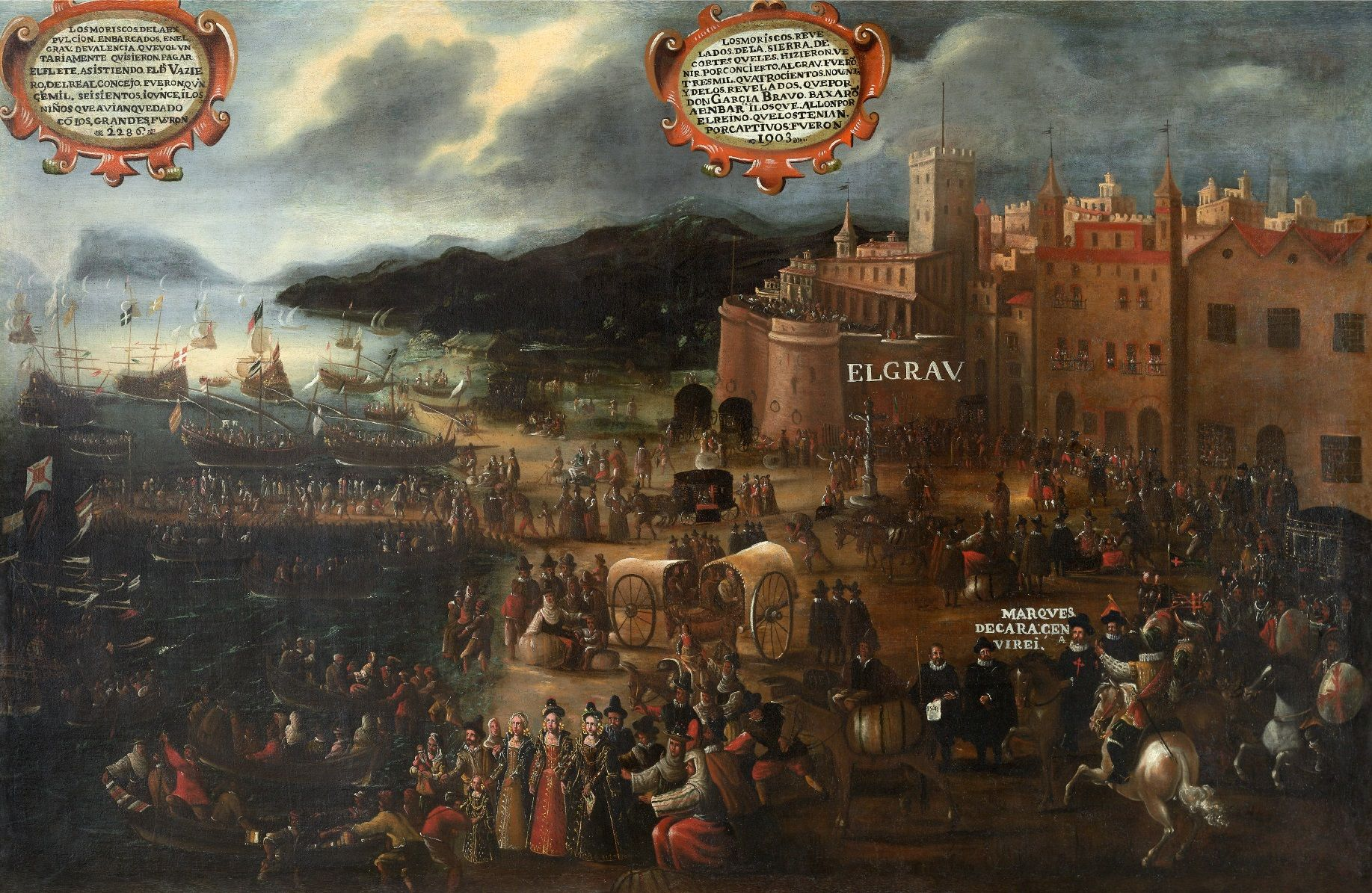
A painting of the 17th century expulsion of the Moriscos from Valencia

=== Arts ===
A 19th century copy of Muhammad al-Jazuli's Dala'il al-Khayrat copied by the Sufi master calligrapher and scholar Muhammad Bin Al-Qasim al-Qundusi (died 1861) in a unique script he developed in Fes

Maghrebi Arabic script is an important part of the history of visual art in Fes. While some aspects of Maghrebi script are codified and prescribed, there have also been innovations, such as those by the 19th century calligrapher Muhammad al-Qandusi.

Fez remains the most important production center in Morocco for the art of zellij (traditional mosaic tilework). Zellij workshops in other cities, such as Meknes, Salé and Marrakesh, usually follow or emulate the craftsmanship style of Fez.

The modernist artist Jilali Gharbaoui studied at the Académie des Arts in Fes.

Joseph Bouhsira was one of the earliest Moroccan photographers.

==== Music ====
Fes is associated with the tarab al-āla (Arabic: طرب الآلة, lit. 'joy of the instrument') musical style, a result of a large migration of Muslims from Valencia to Fes. The Fessi āla style utilizes the Moroccan forms of the Andalusi nubah melodic arrangements. While this musical style is sometimes popularly referred to as Andalusi music, those who have studied it reject this naming: Mohamed El Fassi intentionally chose the name āla (Arabic: آلة, lit. 'instrument') to differentiate it from the Sufi tradition of samā, which is purely vocal, while Idrīs Bin Jellūn at-Twīmī, in his study of Mohammed al-Haik's Kunash al-Haik (Arabic: كناش الحائك), described the appellation "Andalusi music" as an unprecedented colonial invention "meant to detract from [the musical form's] Arabness and [Moroccans'] intellectual and artistic abilities."

=== Cultural venues and institutions ===
The city's main museums are housed in historic monuments mentioned above, including the Nejjarine Museum, the Dar Batha Museum, and the Arms Museum in Borj Nord. The Al Houria Cultural Complex, opened in 2005, is a cultural center in the Ville Nouvelle that includes a theatre, a media library, and exhibition spaces. Several language institutes in Fez also organize cultural activities in addition to offering courses. The French Institute and the Cervantes Institute have branches in Fez which promote French and Spanish, respectively. The American Language Center and the Arabic Language Institute in Fez, sister organizations that share the same location in the Ville Nouvelle, offer courses in English and Arabic, respectively.

=== Festivals ===
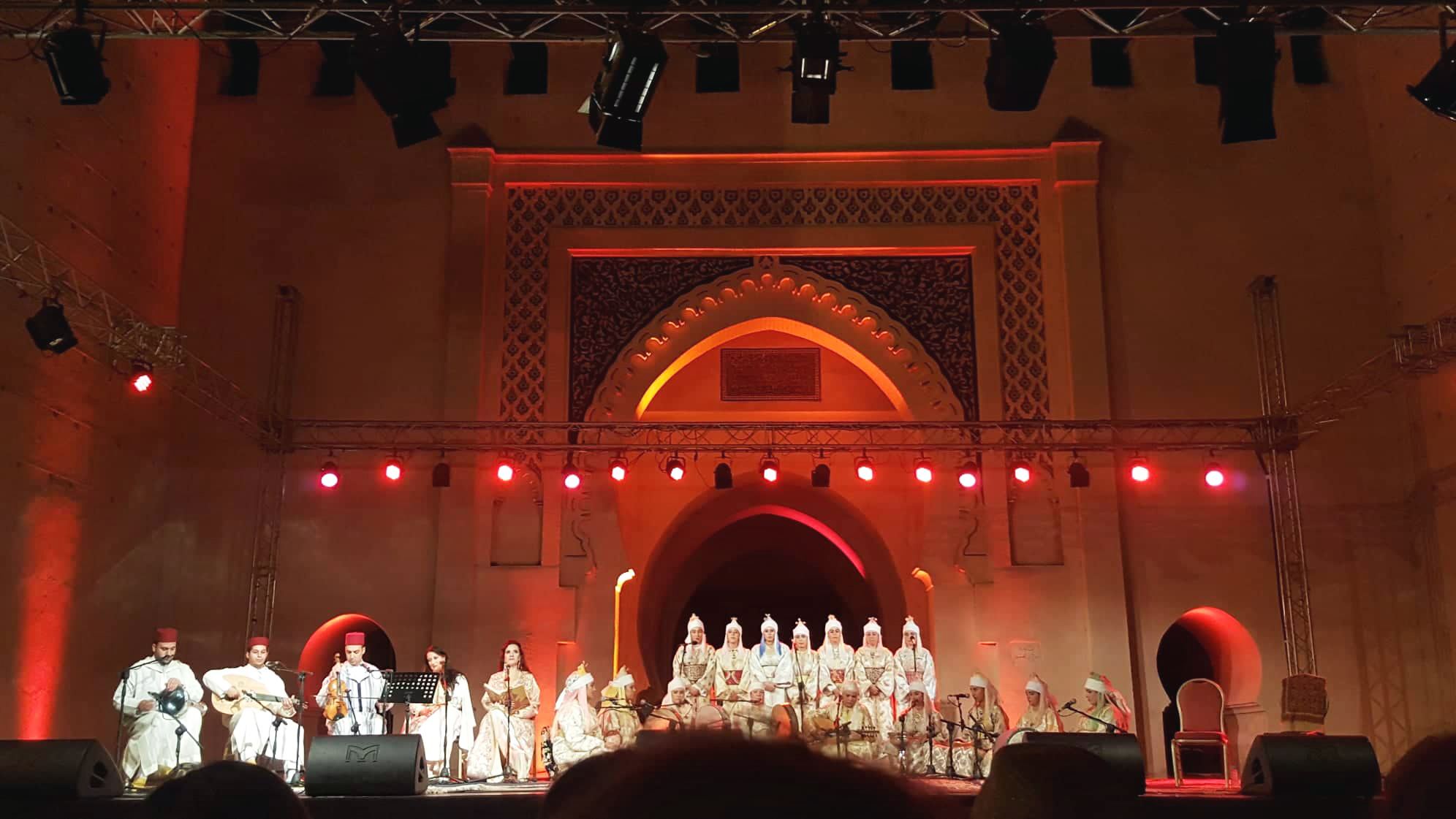
Performance at the World Sacred Music Festival in 2018 (Bab Dekkakin in the background)

Fez hosts the annual World Sacred Music Festival, which started in 1994 and showcases religious music from around the world. The festival occurs in May or June and concerts take place at multiple venues across the city, including at historic sites such as Bab Makina (the New Mechouar) in Fes Jdid. The annual Festival of Amazigh Culture, which started in 2005, normally takes place in July and hosts performances from Amazigh (Berber) musicians and artists from across Morocco. The annual Festival of Sufi Culture hosts a conference with discussions and debates on Sufism as well as Sufi musical performances and rituals such as haḍras. The Festival of Malhoun Art features performances of malhun music and poetry from across the country.

Multiple moussems (Sufi religious festivals) have traditionally taken place every year in honour of local Muslim saints and are typically sponsored by one or more of the city's guilds. The most important moussem in the city, and one of the most important in Morocco, is the Moussem of Moulay Idris II. This festival has taken place for hundreds of years (Note: The veneration of Idris II as a patron saint began in the 15th century and so the moussem developed some time after this.) and is sponsored by all the guilds in the city, who march through the city together in a procession that culminates at the mausoleum of Idris II. Each guild donates gifts to the zawiya, one of which is a keswa, a large textile decorated with Qur'anic verses that is draped over Idris II's catafalque. The week of the moussem is also marked by other cultural events and entertainment.

The Fez Running Festival is race that has taken place annually since 2022 with two competitions, one for kids and one for adults. It is organized by Abderrahime Bouramdane, a professional marathon runner who was born and raised in Fez. The festival sees thousands of participants every year who run a course that goes throughout the city.

=== Sport ===
Fez has two football teams, MAS Fez (Fés Maghrebi) and Wydad de Fès (WAF). They both play in the Botola the highest tier of the Moroccan football system and play their home matches at the 45,000 seat Complexe Sportif de Fès stadium.

Fez is one of the cities expected to host matches during the 2030 FIFA World Cup and there are plans to upgrade its sports stadium before this date. It is also expected to host matches during the 2025 Africa Cup of Nations.

The MAS Fez basketball team competes in the Nationale 1, Morocco's top basketball division.

== Infrastructure ==
=== Parks ===
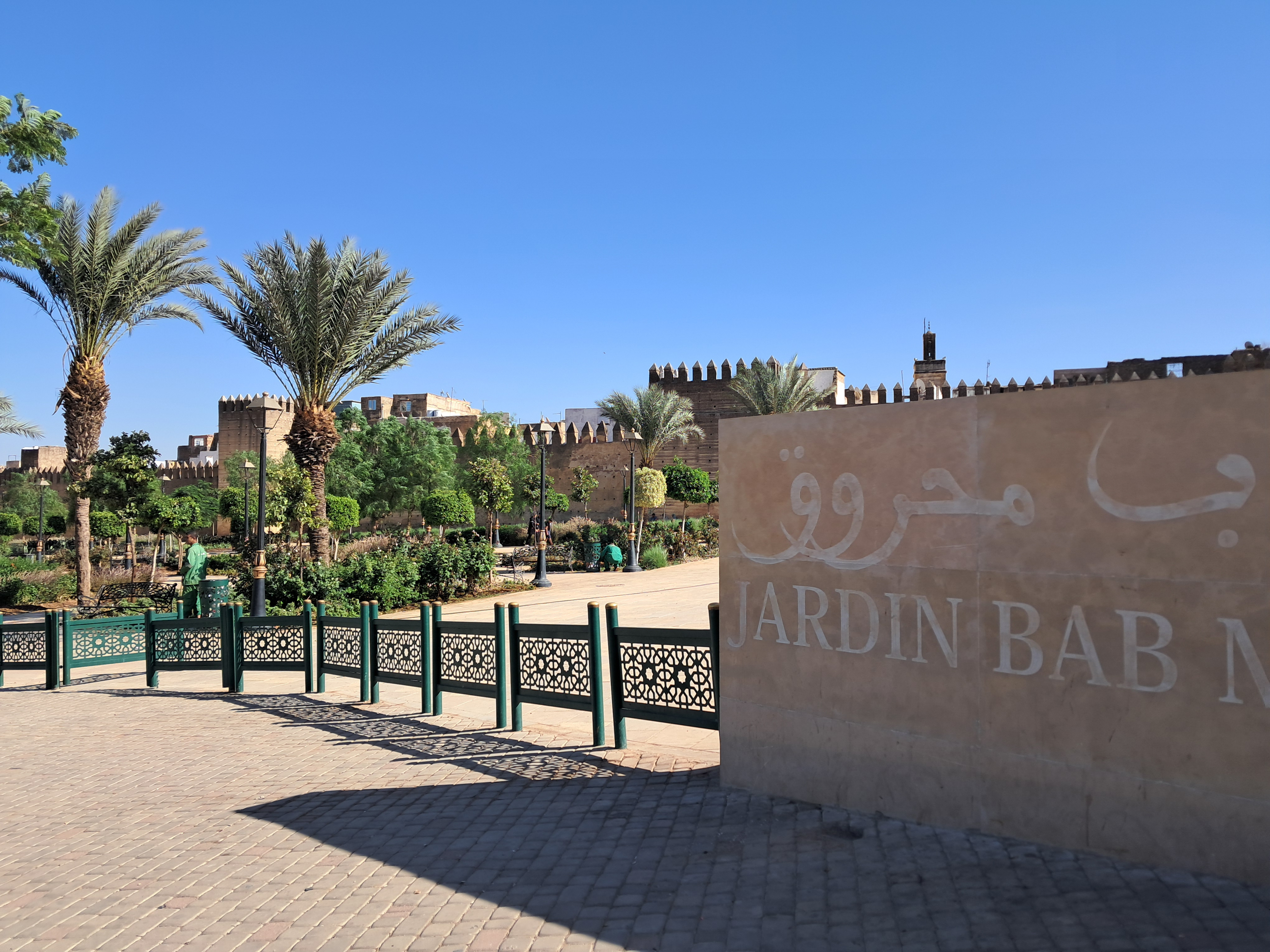
Bab Mehrouk park

The availability of green spaces in Fez is limited and significantly deviates from the international standard, which calls for a minimum of ten square meters of green space per resident. As of 2022, the city provides only two square meters of green space per resident.

Latin American Park is a park opened in the summer of 2015 that sits in the middle of Fez. It is around 3,700 square metres in area and employs about 40 workers. The park is dedicated to the relations of Fez and Latin America; its inauguration ceremony was attended by a delegation of ambassadors from Venezuela, Paraguay, and Panama. Latin American Park includes a number of facilities, such as a pool, a children's pavilion, cafes, and several trails.

The Bird Park or Tropicana Park is another green area in Fez. Over seven acres in size, it features playgrounds, community event spaces, restaurants, and rest areas. The park was opened in June 2014 and is credited with significantly improving the recreational infrastructure of Fez. Inside the park is a "Bird Garden" which hosts more than thirty species of birds, local and imported, such as peacocks, parrots, and the North African ostrich. There are also ponds with geese and ducks.

=== Transport ===
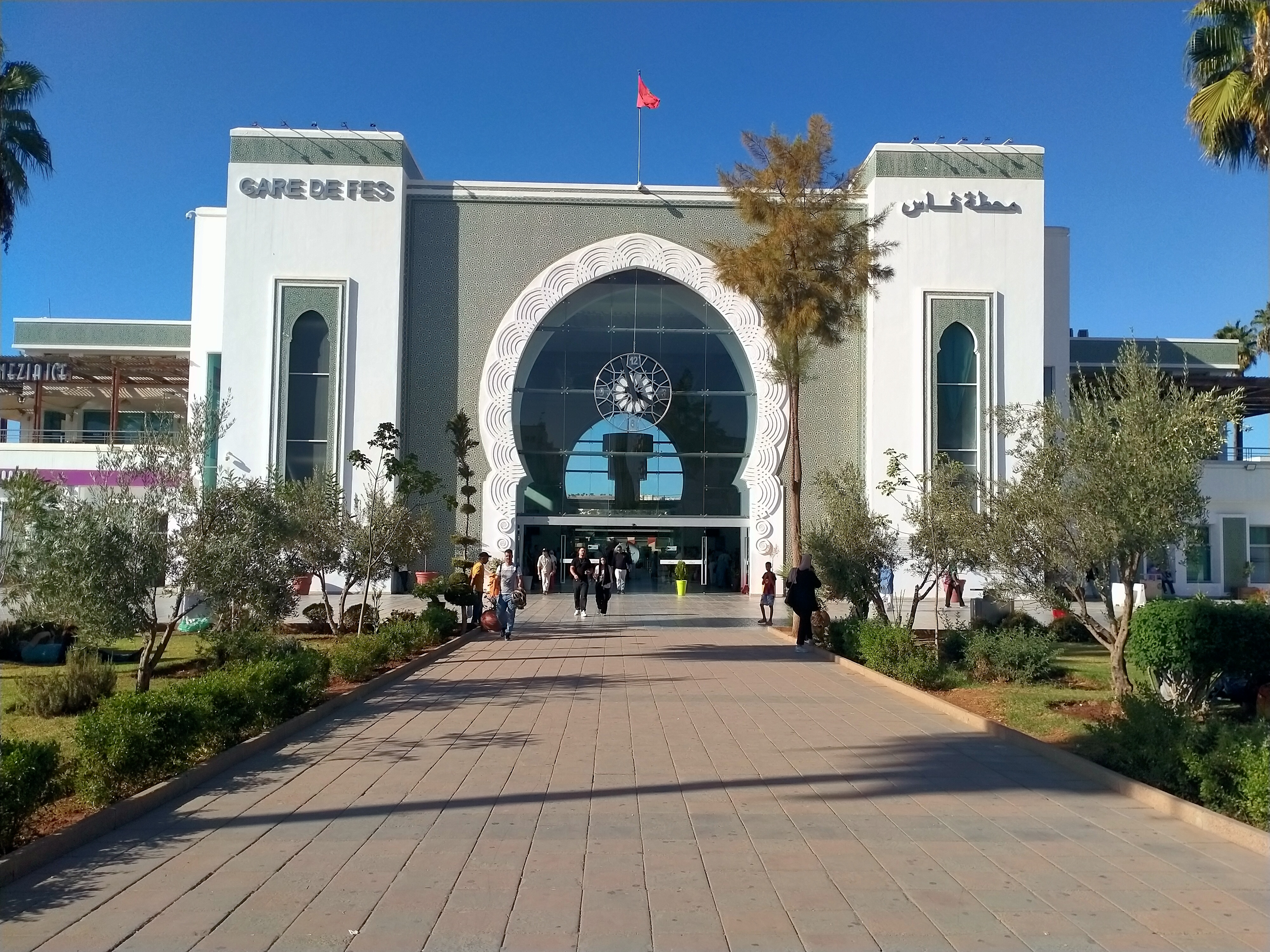
Main railway station

The city is served by the region's main international airport, Fès–Saïs, located roughly 15 km south of the city center. A new terminal was added to the airport in 2017 which expanded the airport's capacity to 2.5 million visitors a year.

The city's main train station, operated by ONCF, is located a short distance from the downtown area of the Ville Nouvelle and is connected to the rail lines running east to Oujda and west to Tangier and Casablanca. The main intercity bus terminal (or gare routière) is located just north of Bab Mahrouk, on the outskirts of the old medina, although CTM also operates a terminal off Boulevard Mohammed V in the Ville Nouvelle. Intercity taxis (also known as grands taxis) depart from and arrive at several spots including the Bab Mahrouk bus station (for western destinations like Meknes and Rabat), Bab Ftouh (for eastern destinations like Sidi Harazem and Taza), and another lot in the Ville Nouvelle (for southern destinations like Sefrou).

The city operates a public transit system with various bus routes.

=== Utilities ===
The city's water supply, sewage, and electricity networks are managed by the Régie de distribution d'eau et d'électricité de Fès (lit. transl. Water and Electricity Distribution Authority of Fez). An activated sludge treatment plant has been treating Fez's wastewater since 2014.

== Education ==
Faculty of Letters and Human Sciences - Dhar El Mahraz

University of al-Qarawiyyin

Primary and secondary education in Fez is administered by Morocco's Ministry of National Education. It includes a preschool level, six years of primary school, followed by three years of middle school and three years of secondary school. Primary education, beginning at age six, is both free and obligatory. Vocational education is also offered.

Fez's University of al-Qarawiyyin is considered by some to be the oldest continually-operating university in the world. The university was first founded as a mosque by Fatima al-Fihri in 859 which subsequently became one of the leading spiritual and educational centers of the historic Muslim world. It became a state university in 1963, and remains an important institution of learning today.

Sidi Mohamed Ben Abdellah University is a public university founded in 1975 and is the largest in the city by attendance, counting over 86,000 students in 2020. It has 12 faculties with sites across Fez; the two main campuses are known as Dhar El Mehraz and Sais. Euro-Med University of Fez, another public university, was created in 2012 and is certified by the Union for the Mediterranean.

The École polytechnique de Technologie was started in 2006 and quickly established itself as one of the leading institutions in the private higher education sector in the city of Fez. In 2013, it became the Private University of Fez, the city's first private university. Its main focus is its engineering school, though it also offers diplomas in architecture, business, and law.

== International relations ==
Fez is twinned with:

- Bobo-Dioulasso, Burkina Faso (1982)
- Chengdu, China (2015)
- Coimbra, Portugal
- Córdoba, Spain (1990)
- Florence, Italy (1961)
- Jericho, Palestine (2014)
- East Jerusalem, Palestine (1982)
- Kairouan, Tunisia (1965)
- Kraków, Poland (1985)
- Montpellier, France (2003)
- Saint-Louis, Senegal (1979)
- Suwon, South Korea (2003)
- Wuxi, China (2011)
- Xi'an, China (2019)

== Notable people ==
- Abd al-Hafid of Morocco – Sultan of Morocco from 1909 to 1912, born in Fez
- Abdellatif Laabi – Poet born in 1942 in Fez
- Abderrahime Bouramdane – Professional marathoner from Fez
- Abdessalam Benjelloun – Former international footballer born in Fez
- Adel Taarabt – Moroccan association football player from Fez
- Adnane Remmal – Professor at Sidi Mohamed Ben Abdellah University in Fez
- Ahmad Zarruq – Prominent Islamic scholar
- Akram Roumani – Former international footballer born in Fez
- Ali ibn Qasim al-Zaqqaq – Author in the field of Maliki common law
- Anas Zniti – Professional footballer born in Fez
- Dunash ben Labrat – Commentator and poet born in Fez
- Hamid Chabat – Moroccan politician and former mayor of Fez
- Isaac Uziel – Physician, poet, and grammarian, born in Fez
- Jilali Gharbaoui – Modernist artist, studied at the Académie des Arts in Fes
- Karim Bennani – Moroccan painter born in Fez
- Mehdi Bennani – Moroccan professional racing driver, born in Fez
- Mohamed Métalsi, urbanist and architectural historian, author of Fès: La ville essentielle
- Mohamed Chafik – Leading figure in the Amazigh (also known as Berber) cultural movement, born in Fez
- Princess Lalla Salma of Morocco – Princess consort of Morocco, born in Fez
- Rachid Yazami – Scientist, engineer and inventor born in Fez
- Roberto López Ufarte – Professional footballer from Fez
- Samuel Pallache – Merchant, diplomat, and pirate, born in Fez
- Soufiane El Bakkali – Steeplechase runner, born in Fez
- Touria Chaoui – first female Moroccan aviator to get a pilot's license
- Youssef En-Nesyri – International footballer born in Fez
- Yves Lacoste – French geographer and geopolitician, born in Fez
- Zaynab Abd al-Razzaq – lawyer and the first female judge in Morocco, born in Fez
