= Zawiya of Moulay Idris II =

Religious site and building in Fez, Morocco

- زاوية إدريس الثاني
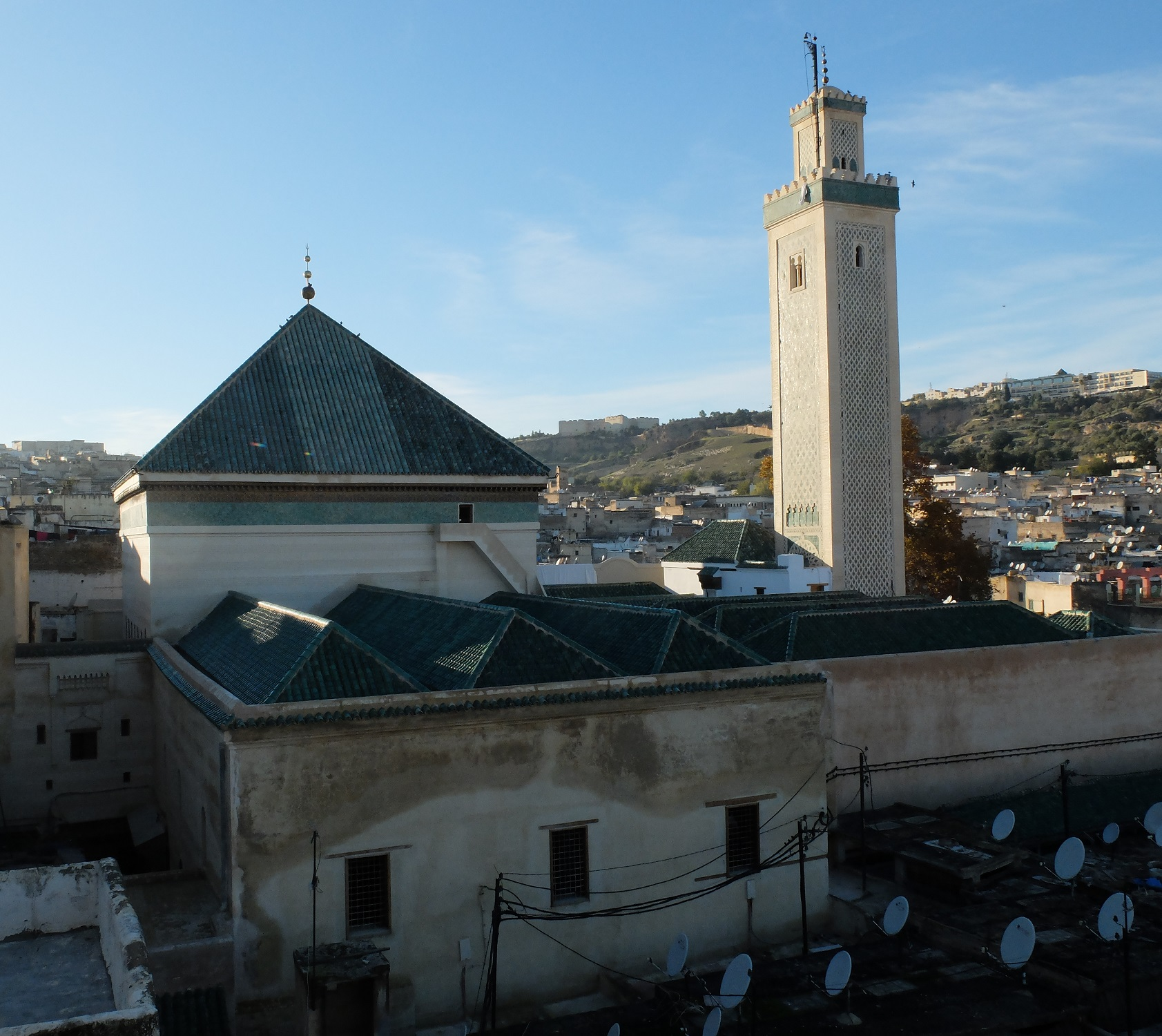

Religion
- Affiliation: Islam
- Status: active

Location
- Location: Fez, Morocco
- Interactive map of Zawiya of Moulay Idris II
- Coordinates: 34°03′53.45″N 4°58′29.00″W

Architecture
- Type: Zawiya
- Style: Moorish (Alawi)
- Founder: Idris II
- Established: 9th century (first mosque)
- Completed: 1720 (current building); 1824 (expansion)

Specifications
- Minaret: 1
- Materials: brick, wood, stucco, tile

The Zawiya of Moulay Idris II (Arabic: زاوية مولاي إدريس الثاني) is a zawiya (Sufi Islamic religious complex) in Fez, Morocco. One of the holiest shrines in Morocco, it contains the tomb of Idris II, a sharif (descendant of Muhammad) who ruled what is now Morocco from 807 to 828 and is traditionally considered the founder and patron saint of Fez. It is located in the heart of Fes el-Bali, the historic medina of the city.

It was originally the site of the Shurafa Mosque from the 9th century before falling into neglect during later centuries. Through the 14th and 15th centuries, the shrine's importance was revived as the religious significance of sharifs grew and when, according traditional accounts, Idris II's body was rediscovered in 1437. It underwent various renovations after this. A major reconstruction was sponsored by Sultan Moulay Ismail in the early 18th century, which gave the sanctuary its overall current form, including the minaret and the mausoleum chamber with its large pyramidal roof.

== History ==
=== Background: Moulay Idris II ===
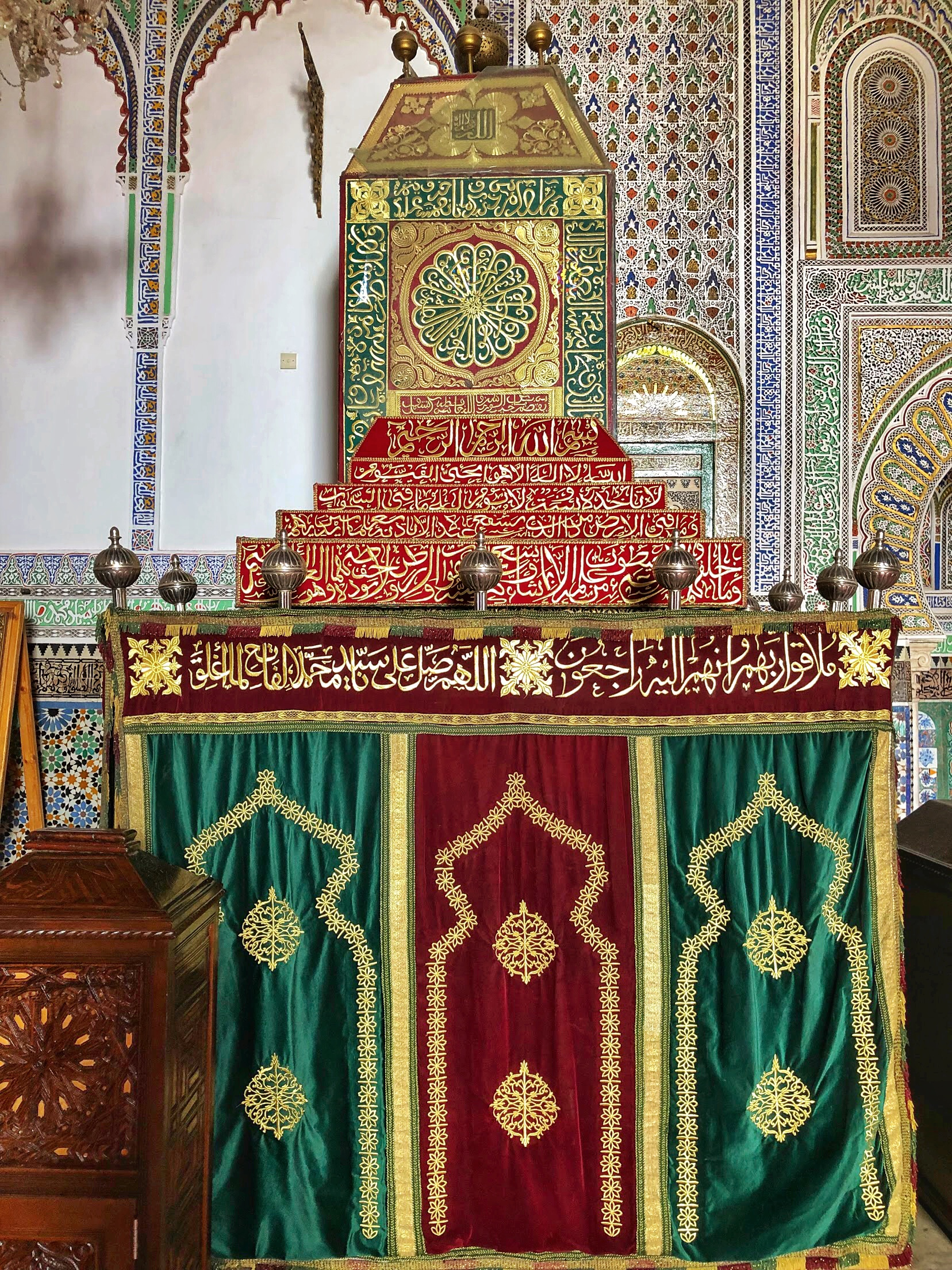
The catafalque over the tomb of Idris II in the mausoleum

Idris II, born in 791, was the son and successor of Idris I. Idris I was a descendant of the Muhammad who fled from Abbasid-controlled territory after the Battle of Fakh because he had supported the defeated pro-Shi'a rebels. He used his prestige as a descendant of Muhammad to forge an alliance with local Berbers in 789 and quickly became the most important religious and political leader in the region. He died soon after in 791, just before his son Idris (II) was born. After Idris II officially took over his position as ruler in 803, he significantly expanded the authority of the new Idrisid state. With the help of new Arab immigrants, he gained independence from his Berber allies and extended Idrisid control to include most of what is today Morocco and parts of eastern Algeria. Under his rule and that of his Idrisid succcessors, the islamization of Morocco also progressed significantly. He died in 828.

Idris II is also responsible for moving the capital of his state from Walili (former Volubilis) to what is now Fez, founding in 809 a new city on the west bank of the river across from another settlement on the east bank founded by his father in 789. According to traditional medieval Arabic sources, however, Idris II founded both settlements one year apart and was thus the founder of the city. In any case, he and his successors turned Fez into an important capital and urban center of Morocco, and the city accrued prestige with the creation of institutions like the Qarawiyyin Mosque (now a university) in 859. The reputation of Moulay Idris II was maintained and revived over time. He came to be considered the patron saint of the city of Fez and his shrine is one of the holiest in Morocco.

=== Early history (9th–13th centuries) ===
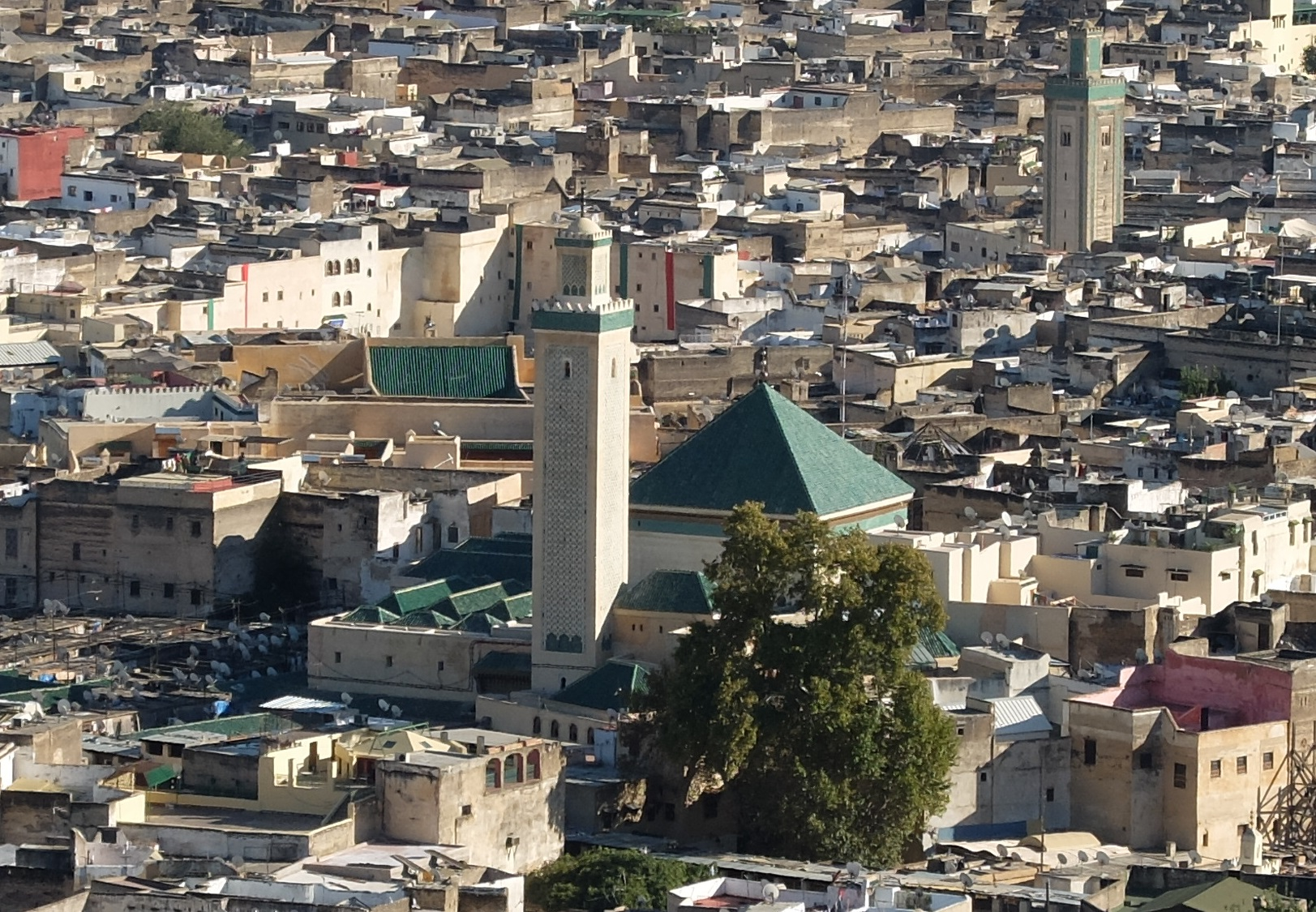
The zawiya, marked by its tall minaret, in the heart of Fes el-Bali

There is little certain information about the shrine before the Marinid dynasty period (14th–15th centuries). The history of both the shrine and the religious culture surrounding it is not clearly traceable until the resurgence of the sharifs (families and dynasties recognized as descending from Muhammad) in Morocco's political and religious life which took place slowly during the Marinid period.

While there is disagreement among sources as to what happened to Idris II's body after his death, most believe that he was buried in the mosque he had built next to his palace of Dar al-Qaytun (House of the Tent) in the center of Fes, possibly in a mausoleum on its eastern side. This building is later referred to as the Shurafa Mosque (or Mosque of the Sharifs) and it served as the early Friday mosque (the main mosque where the Friday sermon, khutba, was delivered) of the city. It could have been built around the same time that Idris II founded his settlement in this area in 808 or 809. The 11th-century author al-Bakri described the mosque as consisting of a hypostyle prayer hall with three transverse aisles oriented roughly east-to-west and a large courtyard (sahn) planted with olive trees.

During the rivalry between the Umayyads of Cordoba and the Fatimids in the 10th century, Fez and northern Morocco came under the domination of the Zenata Berbers, who deposed the Idrisids in 917–921. Moussa ibn Abi al-'Afya, whom the Zenata placed in charge of Fez, persecuted the descendants of Idris, drove them out of the city, and took measures to discredit their reputation. Among other things, he publicly denied that the Shurafa Mosque contained the real tomb of Idris II, promoting the story (reported in some sources) that Idris II had instead been buried next to his father in the town of Moulay Idriss Zerhoun (about 50 kilometers west of Fez). Finally, at some point around this period the khutba (Friday sermon) was transferred to the al-Qarawiyyin Mosque, thus robbing the Shurafa Mosque of its status as the community's main mosque. This transfer happened either in 919–18 or in 933, both dates right after a brief period of Fatimid domination over the city, which suggests that the transfer may have occurred on Fatimid initiative.

Over the following decades, further regime changes and military interventions by powers from outside Morocco resulted in political instability and the complete disenfranchisement of the Idrisids. In 1069 Fez was conquered by the Almoravids, who promoted a stricter and more orthodox version of Sunni Islam (following the Maliki maddhab) that was hostile to the cult of "saints", resulting in another exodus of the sharifian families from the city. As the Idrisids lost power and Fez came under the control of other rulers who were hostile to their influence, the mosque and the mausoleum were neglected and eventually abandoned, and the cult of Moulay Idris II along with it. By then it was also overshadowed in prestige by the Qarawiyyin, which became the most important institution in Fez. Most of the tombs of saints in the city were also ruined over this time.

=== Marinid period (14th-16th centuries) ===
The religious and political importance of the sharifs (Arabs who claimed descent from the Prophet Muhammad) began to be revived and re-elaborated under the Marinid dynasty. Like the Almoravid and Almohad dynasties before them, the Marinids were Berbers rather than Arabs. Unlike these previous dynasties, however, their political legitimacy was not based on a program of religious reform or on a strong role in defending the Muslim frontier in al-Andalus (present-day Spain) at the time. As a result, they sought new bases of legitimacy. Among other means, they did this by constructing many new madrasas promoting the Maliki Sunni maddhab and its scholars (who became their bureaucracy), while at the same time cautiously fostering the various sharifian dynasties and factions inside Morocco for support.

For the Marinids, based in Fez, the Idrisid cult and its association with Fez itself was still seen as a possible threat and their relationship to it was initially tepid and ambivalent. Notably, when the body of Idris I was allegedly rediscovered in Walili (Volubilis) in 1318, which generated excitement among locals, Marinid officials quickly moved to prevent the story from spreading. However, later Marinid rulers changed their attitudes and progressively re-adapted the story of the Idrisids so as to instead highlight the role of the Marinids as their symbolic successors. The Marinids presented themselves as rulers who were reviving and preserving an orthodox Islamic state in Morocco. Accordingly, writers and officials under their rule (and under the later Wattasids) re-emphasized the link between Fez and its Idrisid founders, presenting the former Idrisids as definitively Sunni rulers (despite Idris I having fled to Morocco due to his Shi'a sympathies), and depicting the Marinids as eager endorsers of the cult of Moulay Idris I and Moulay Idris II.

After the roof and walls of the zawiya collapsed altogether in 1308 following a long period of neglect, Marinid officials allowed the mosque to be rebuilt by Idris' descendants, who rebuilt it exactly as it was. A more crucial event, however, happened in 1437: during preparations to restore the building again, a buried body was discovered on site and was recognized by the legal scholars of the time as being the body of Idris II. Chronicles of the event report that Marinid officials were involved in the decision to subsequently re-inter the body at the same site while restoring the zawiya. A marble panel recounting the event was placed on the wall above the tomb and is still visible today. Modern-day scholars doubt the details of this story, but the event nonetheless marks a rise in the prestige of the zawiya. The cult surrounding Moulay Idris II slowly rekindled, and by the 16th century it was strong and even actively encouraged by the Wattasid rulers (the successors to the Marinids), with regular ceremonies taking place around the tomb.

=== Saadi and Alawi periods (16th century to present) ===
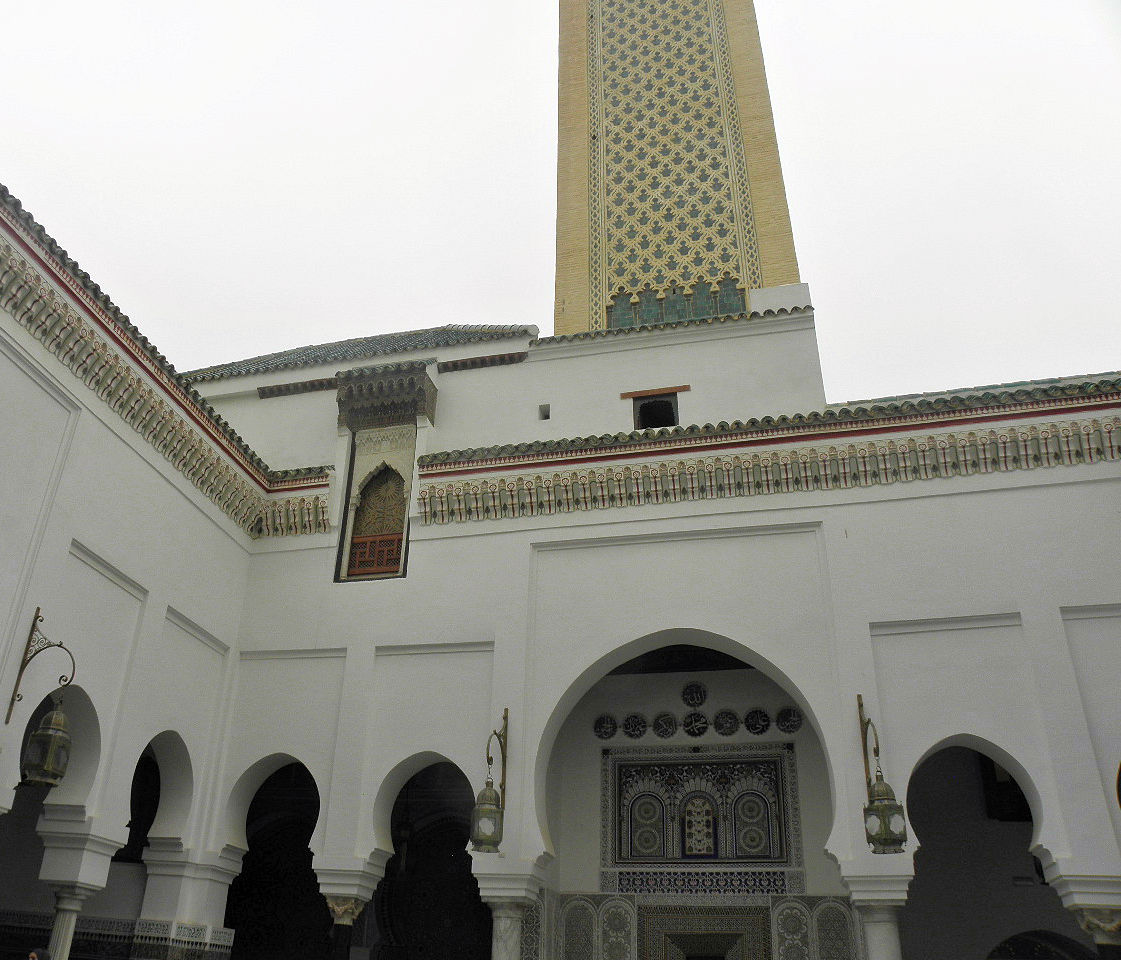
View from the courtyard towards the 18th-century minaret and, on the left, the window of the dar al-muwaqqit (chamber of the mosque's timekeeper). The window has a sculpted marble arch believed to be a Saadian spolia taken from Marrakesh and installed here by Sultan Moulay Isma'il.

At a more national level, the renewed prestige of the sharifs in general was so successful that two sharifian dynasties, the Saadis and the Alawis (the current monarchy to this day), subsequently took over and ruled Morocco. The Idrisids, the original sharifian rulers of early Islamic Morocco, fit more easily into the narrative of political legitimacy of these dynasties. Perhaps because of this, numerous contributions to the zawiya were made throughout this time, culminating in a major reconstruction in the early 18th century which gave the sanctuary its overall current form.

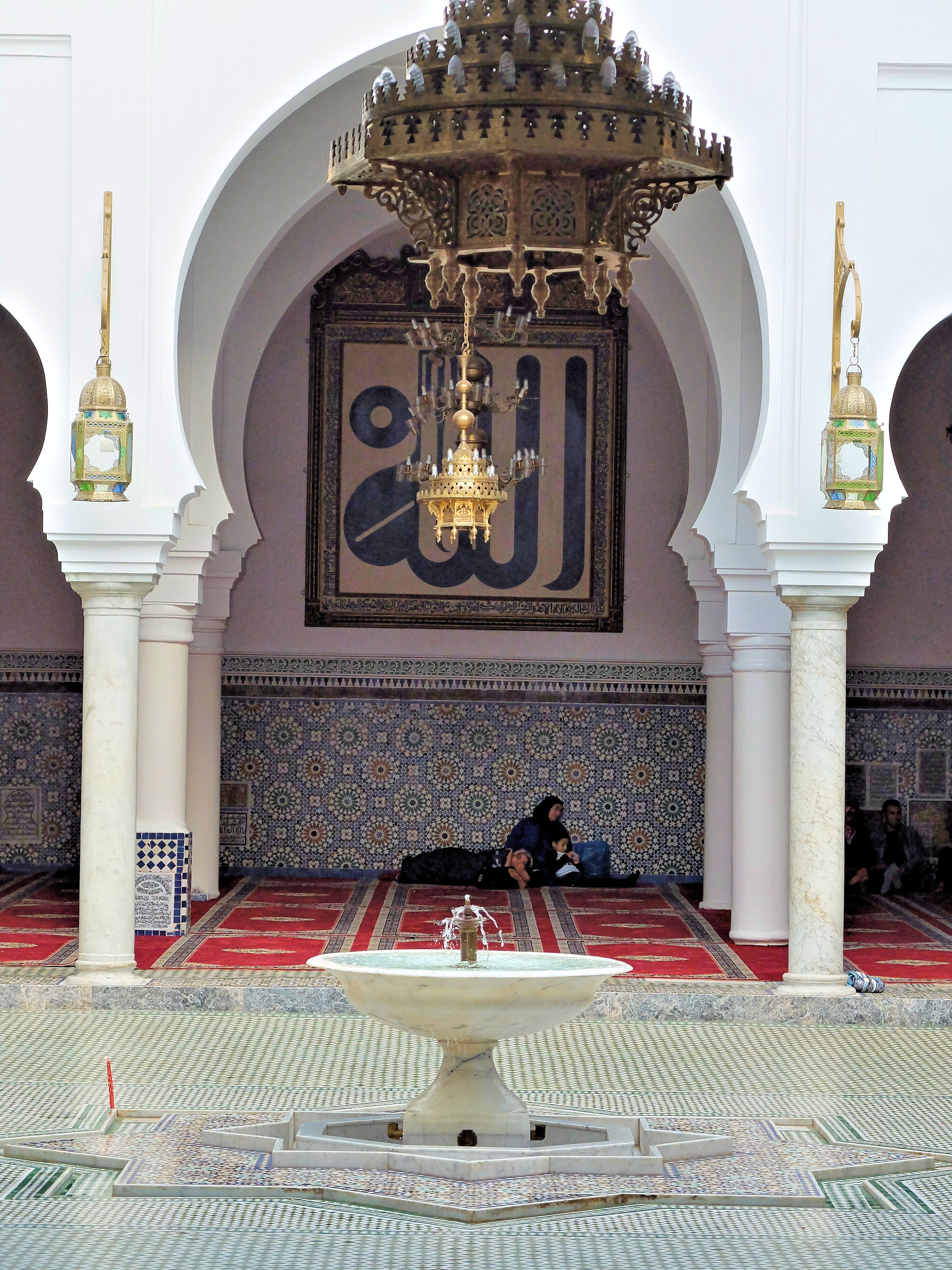
View towards al-Qandusi's large 19th-century calligraphy of the word Allah in the courtyard of the zawiya

In 1557, the Saadi sultan Muhammad al-Shaykh built a new roof over the mausoleum to make it more monumental. In 1603, the last year of Sultan Ahmad al-Mansur's reign, his son, Emir (prince) Zaydan Abu Maali, added more decoration inside the mausoleum. Shortly after, in 1610 or 1611, at the initiative and expense of a generous private individual named Harun al-Andalusi, a private house next to the mausoleum was purchased and its property converted into a courtyard or sahn for the mosque, while another Saadi official (the qadi al-R'assani al-Andalusi) contributed a fountain for the center of the courtyard. In 1644, another individual (named al-Hadj 'Ali ibn Qasem al-Qumini) contributed funds for embellishing the courtyard and also gifted further items for use in the mausoleum.

Under the Alawi dynasty, the first Alawi sultan, Moulay Rashid, made generous donations to the zawiya in 1669. Two other Alawi officials, in 1679 and in 1714, had new fountains installed and new sources of water redirected to the mosque (in one case, redirected from the Qarawiyyin). Most significantly of all, Moulay Ismail, the powerful and long-reigning Alawi sultan, had the entire zawiya rebuilt between 1717 and 1720, including the current minaret and the mausoleum chamber with its large pyramidal roof. This gave the complex its current dimensions (or almost) and the overall decoration it has today. In 1824, another Alawi sultan, 'Abd al-Rahman (or Abderrahman), erected a new mosque extension on a site adjacent to the mausoleum, marking the last significant modification to the structure.

The celebrated Moroccan Sufi calligrapher Muhammad al-Qandusi, who lived in Fes from 1828 until his death in 1861, was responsible for painting the large calligraphic representation of the name Allah on the southern wall of the zawiya's courtyard. Since the 19th century, the zawiya has been restored a few more times. It was renovated in 1956 on the initiative of King Mohammed V and some of the decoration on the outside of the building dates from this time. The complex most recently underwent restoration between 2011 and 2014 under the supervision of architect Rachid Haloui.

== Geography ==
=== Urban environment ===
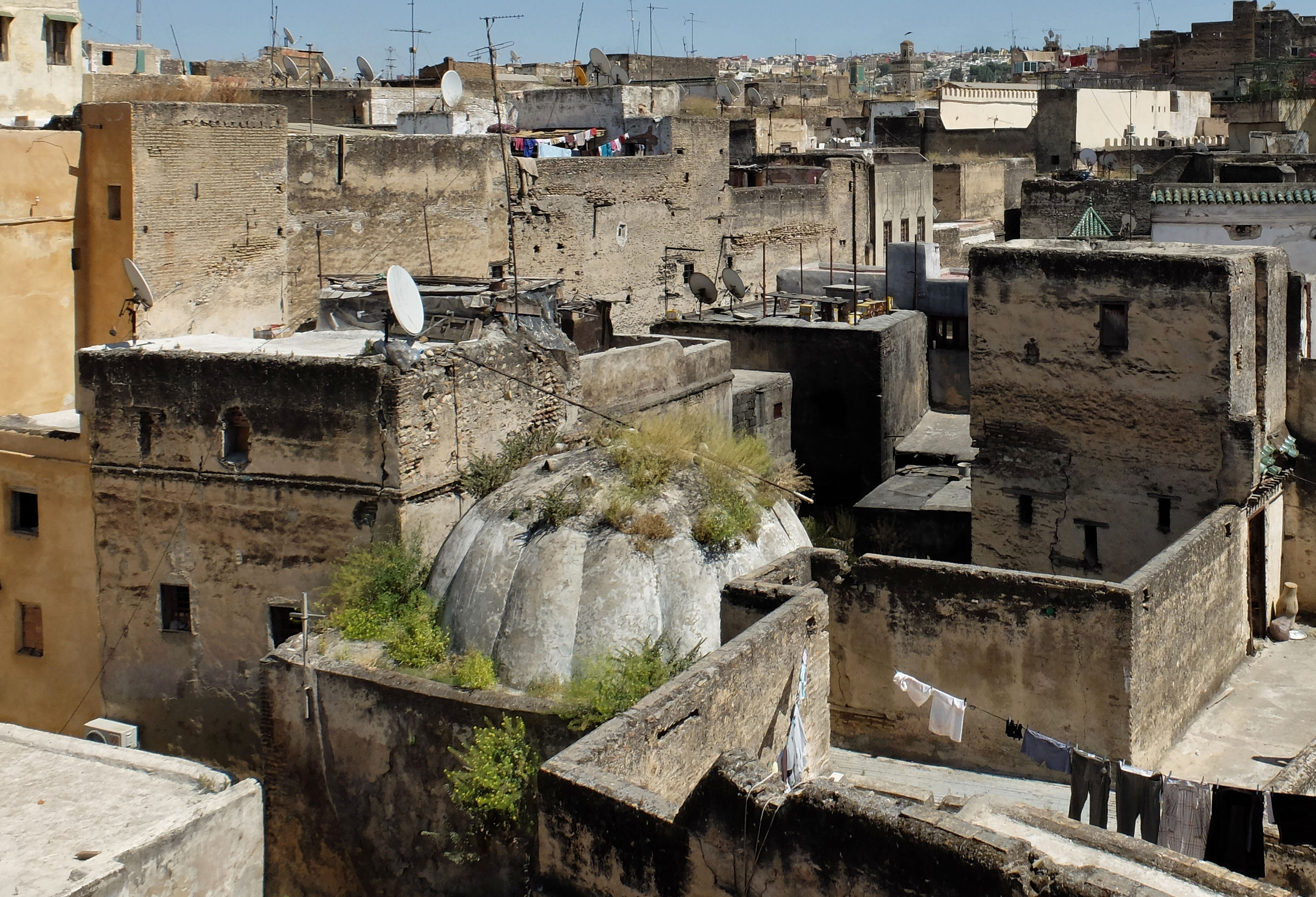
Rooftop view of the dome of the Hammam Moulay Idris, an old hammam near the Nejjarine Museum today which was associated with the zawiya of Moulay Idris II

The zawiya's most prominent external features are its minaret, the tallest in the old city of Fez, and the large green-tiled pyramidal roof over the mausoleum chamber. As a result, it is one of the most visible and easily identifiable buildings on the old medina's skyline. Up close, however, the zawiya is often obscured by the narrow lanes and the densely-packed buildings of the old city. On the zawiya's eastern side is a grid-like set of covered streets which make up a bazaar known as the Kissaria (also spelled kisariyya or qaysariyya), historically the central and most prestigious market in the city, situated between the two most important mosques of the city (the Qarawiyyin Mosque and Idris II's mosque/zawiya). Further west, on the south side of Place Nejjarine, is the historic Hammam Moulay Idris which is associated with his tomb and traditionally considered to confer some of its blessings.

=== The sanctuary (horm) ===
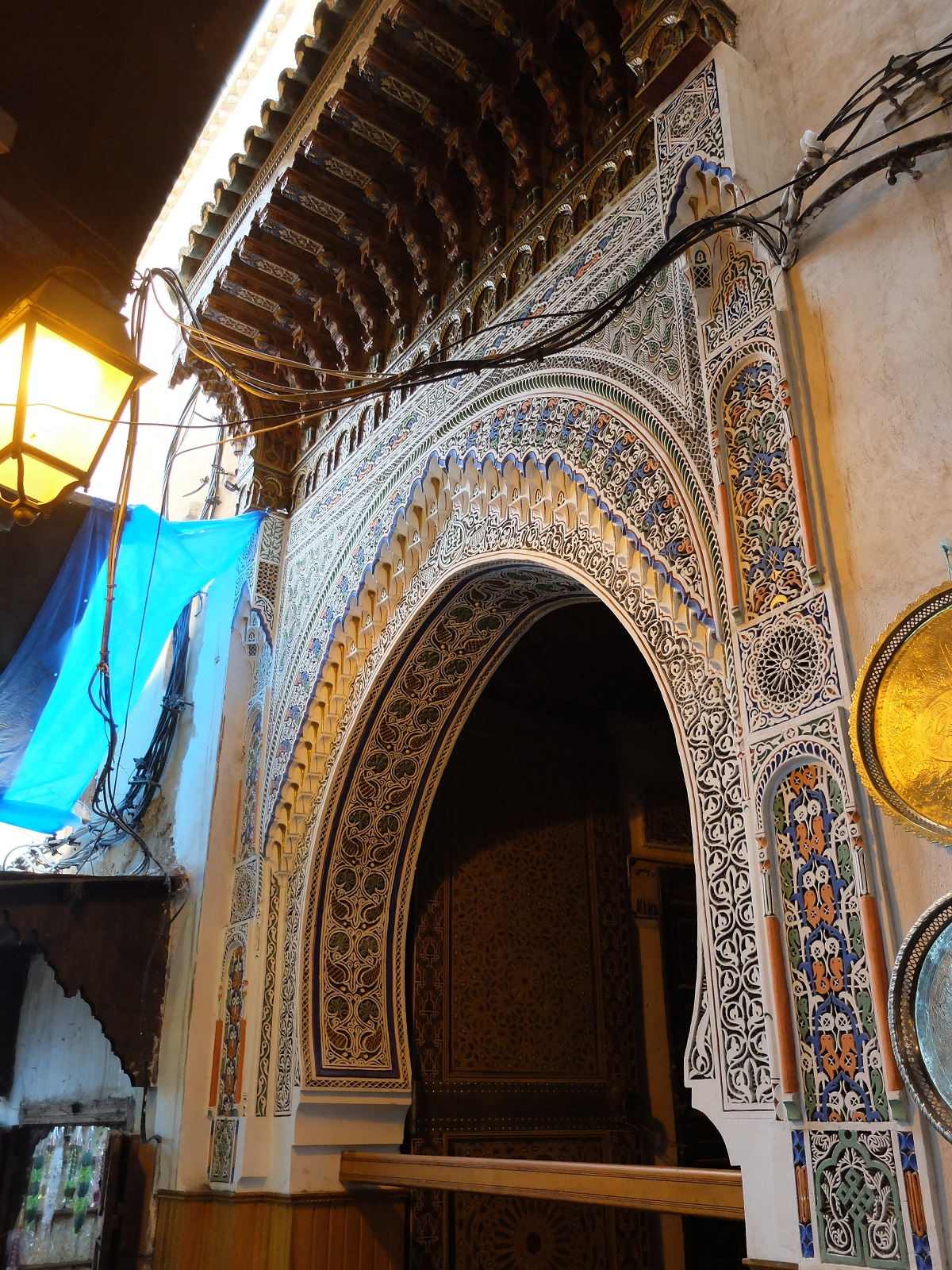
A wooden bar across this street entrance, near the zawiya, denotes the boundary of the sanctuary. Animals (e.g. mules) were historically not allowed past this point.

Some of the streets around and leading to the zawiya are marked at certain points by a horizontal wooden bar under which pedestrians must duck in order to pass. These denoted the extent of the Zawiya's sanctuary or haram (also horm), a protected and sanctified space. Up until the beginning of the French colonial occupation in 1912, non-Muslims and pack animals (e.g. mules, commonly used in the old city) were forbidden to pass beyond this point, and any Muslim within this space was allowed to claim asylum from arrest or prosecution. Today, non-Muslims are not allowed to enter the building itself but can now walk up to its doors and around its perimeter.

This horm or sanctuary also contains multiple other buildings which were generally included in the habous (endowment) of the zawiya. These include:

- The Jama Mqalqin, a small mosque where asylum seekers historically could stay, located northwest of the main zawiya building.
- The Dar al-Qaytoun or Dar Zawiya, a small house reputed to be the former house of Idris II himself, where female asylum seekers or refugees could stay, located on the south side of the Jama Mqalqin.
- An abattoir, located on the north side of the zawiya and near the Kissaria.
- The house of the khatib (preacher), located on the south side of the zawiya and notable for the raised passage above the street which connects it directly to the zawiya itself.
- The Tomb of Lalla Kenza, reputedly the mother of Idris II but possibly another Idrisid woman who owned a shop here and was later permitted to be buried here. It is located in the Derb Dellala street on the west side of the zawiya.

The Zawiya of Moulay Idris was not the only one in the city to have the privileged status of a horm. Other major Sufi sanctuaries in the city, often associated with a particular founder, also offered asylum in this way. These other sanctuaries were the Zawiya of Sidi Abdelkader al-Fassi, the Zawiya of Sidi Ahmed esh-Shawi, the Zawiya of Sidi Ali Boughaleb, the Zawiya of Moulay Ahmed es-Skalli, and the Zawiya of Sidi Ahmed at-Tijani.

== Architecture ==
The most monumental entrance portal of the zawiya building is on its north side, at the foot of the minaret and at the end of a lane leading directly off the major souq street of Tala'a Kebira. This entrance leads into the sahn or main courtyard, which includes a central fountain of white marble dating from the reign of Moulay Ismail (18th century) as well as wall fountains used for ablutions (washing and ritual purification). A large calligraphic representation of the name Allah on the southern wall of the zawiya's courtyard is the work of Muhammad al-Qandusi in the 19th century.

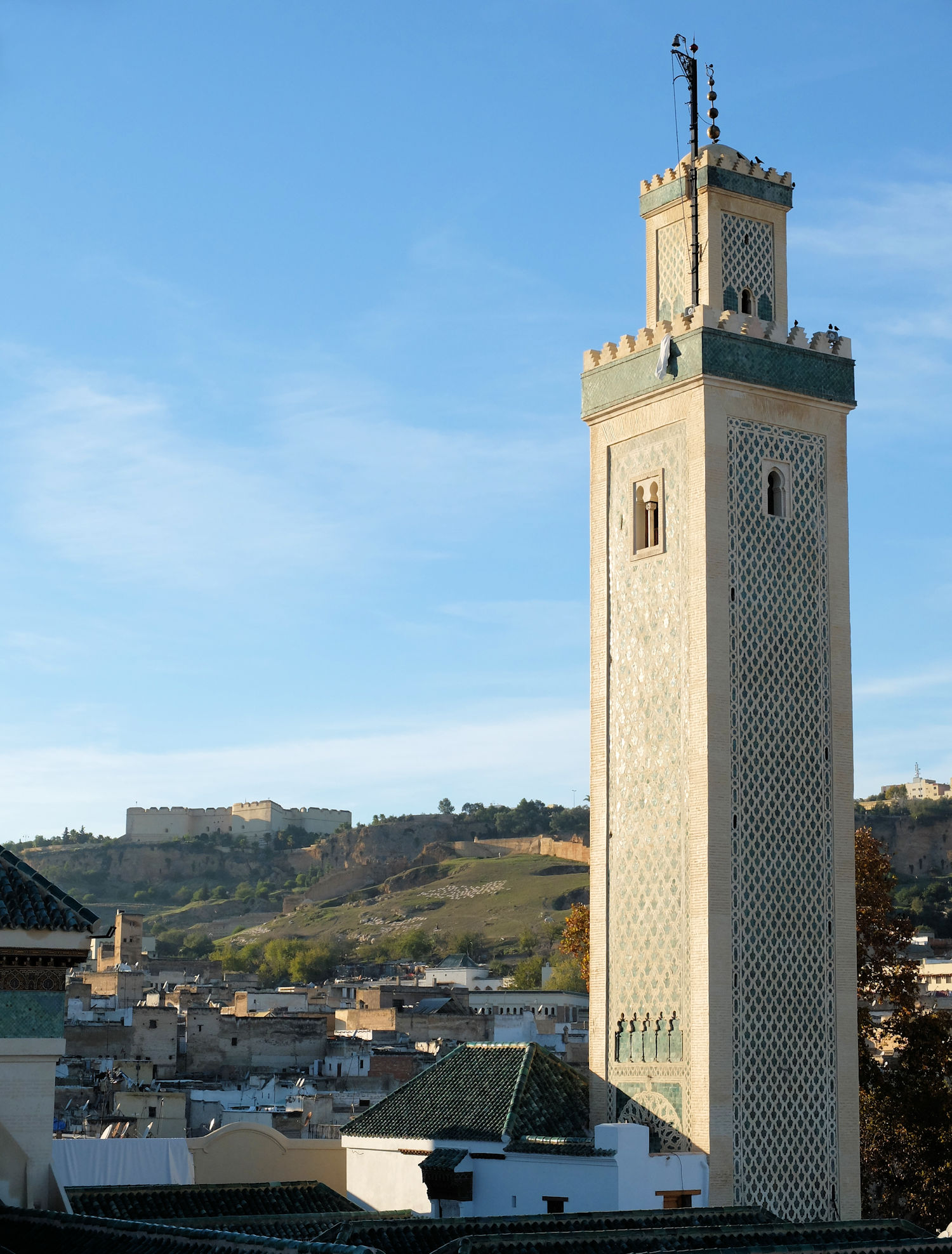
Minaret of the zawiya

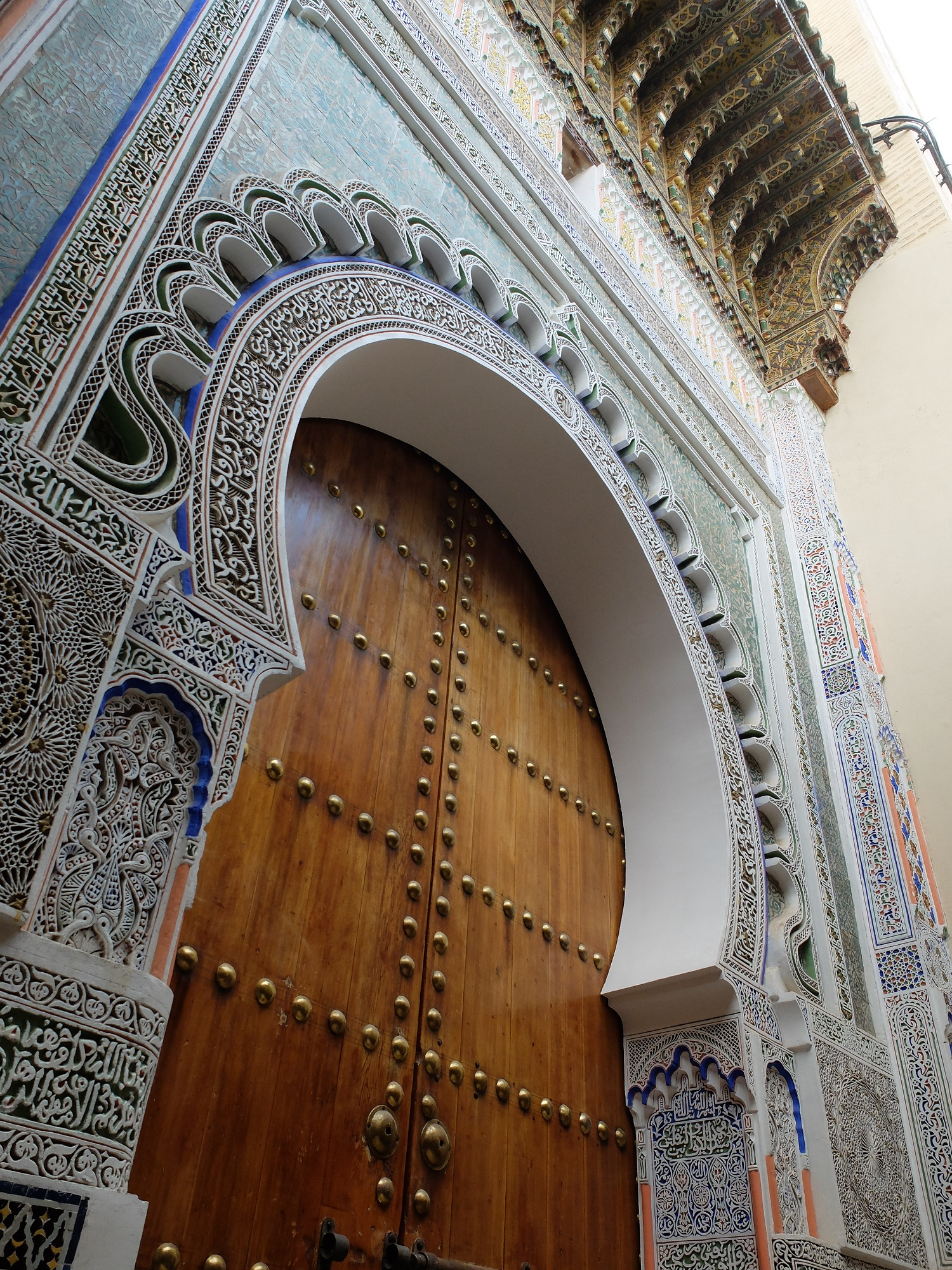
Northern gate

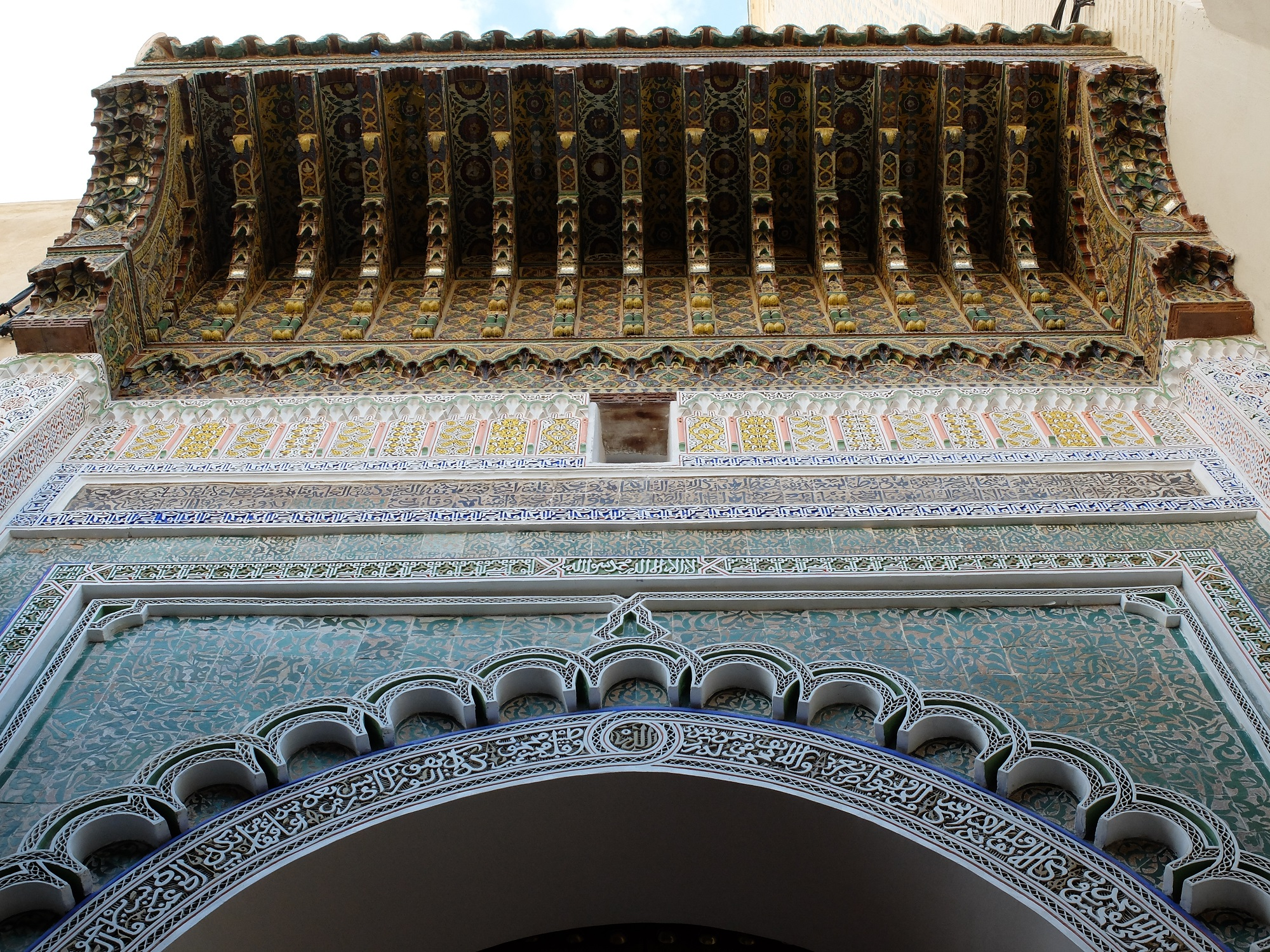
Northern gate

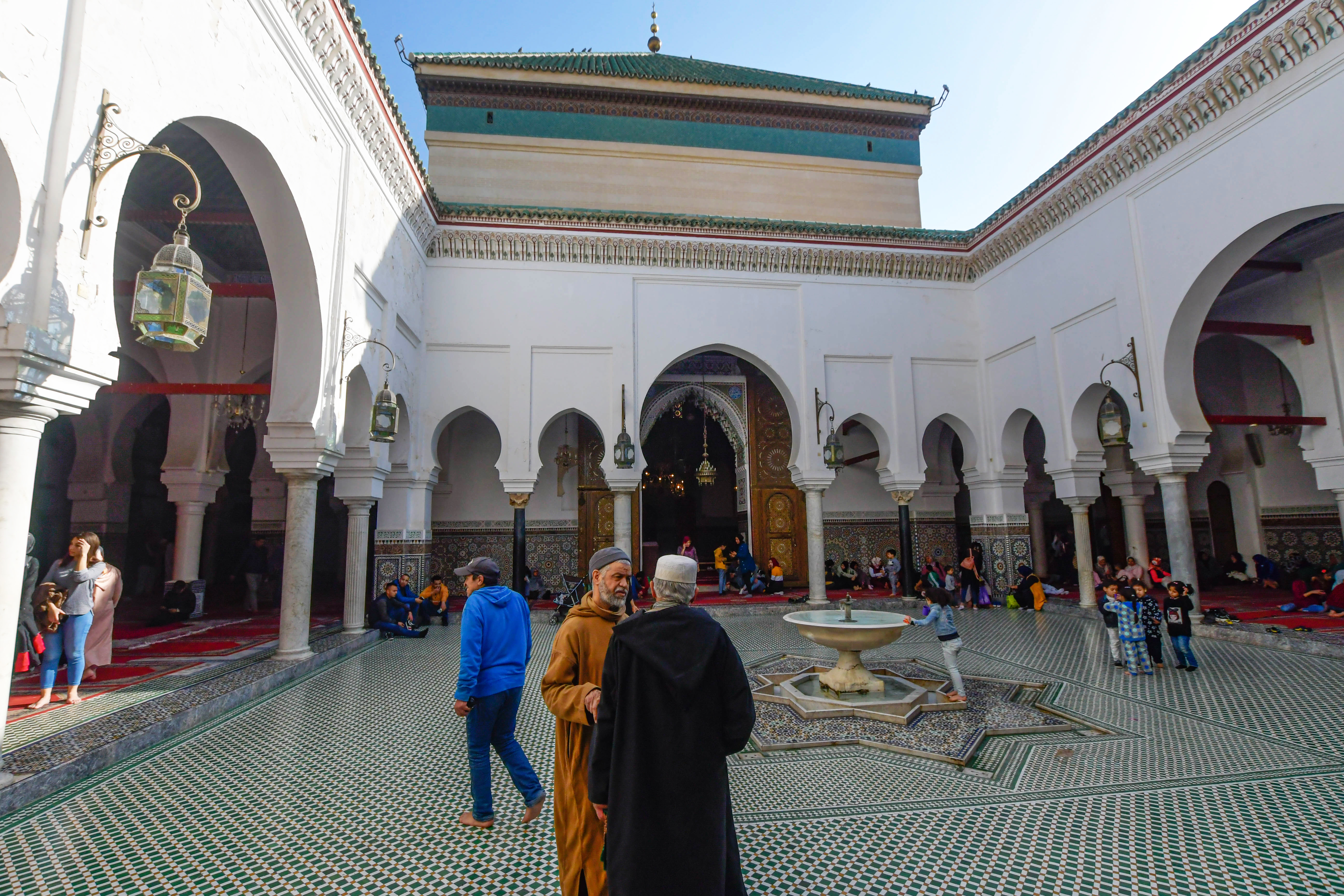
The courtyard (sahn); looking west towards the mausoleum entrance

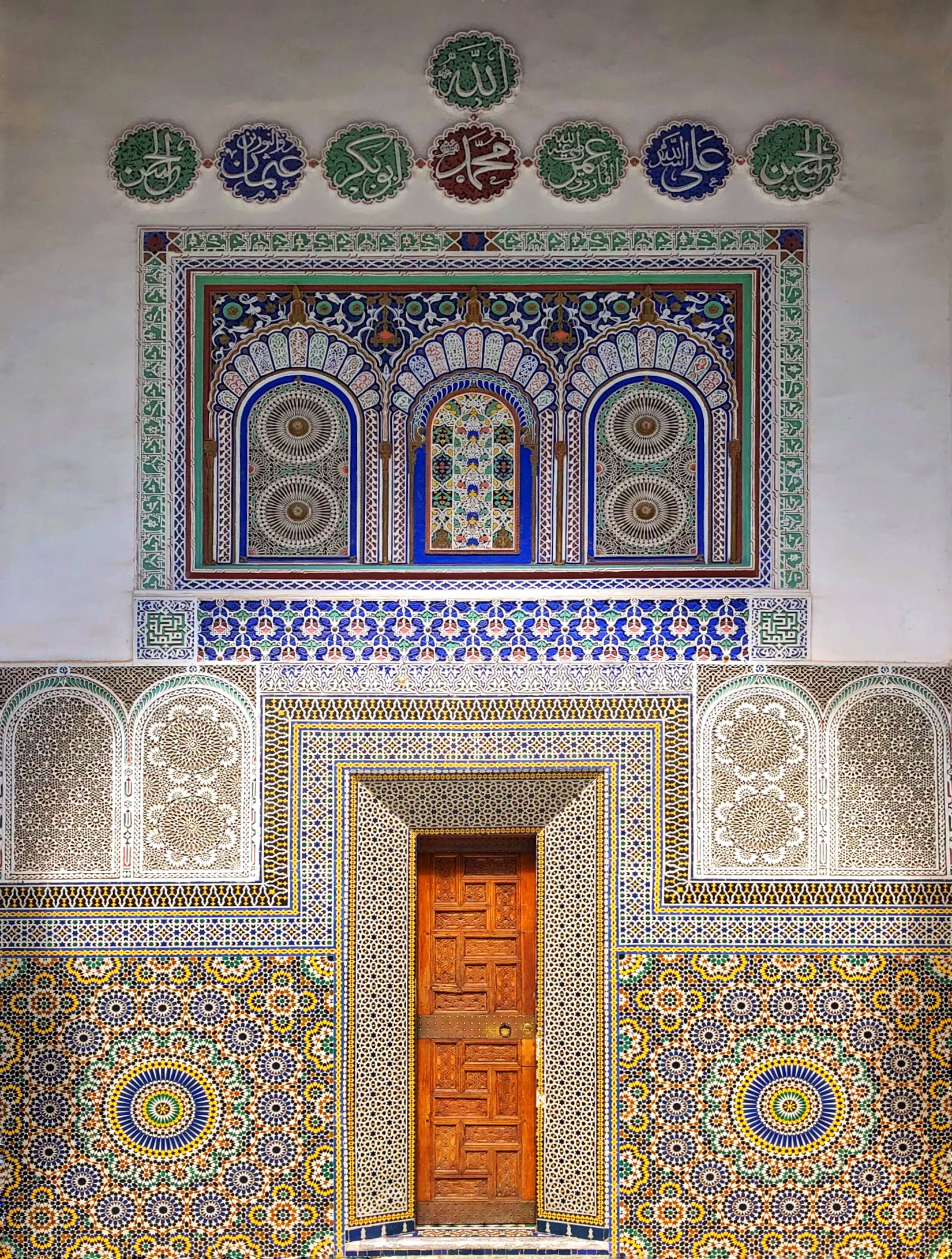
Decoration in the courtyard (a doorway surrounded by zellij and carved stucco, located below the minaret)

At the south end of the courtyard stands the large mausoleum chamber, where Moulay Idris II's tomb is located. The walls and the mihrab of the chamber are richly decorated with carved and painted stucco, mosaic tiles (zellij), and white and black marble columns. The ceiling of the chamber is a large wooden dome, probably composed of hundreds or thousands of small wooden pieces fitted together to create a star-like pattern, as is typical of Moorish/Moroccan architecture. The tomb itself is covered by a wooden baldaquin incrusted with gold and copper and elaborately decorated with gold Arabic calligraphy. The mausoleum can also be directly accessed through a set of cedar-wood doors on the west side of the building, via an equally richly decorated vestibule. (These doors are also the closest that non-Muslims can get to the Mausoleum's interior.) The east side of the complex, adjacent to the courtyard and the mausoleum, is a roofed hypostyle space for prayer, including the mosque space built by Sultan Abd al-Rahman in 1824.

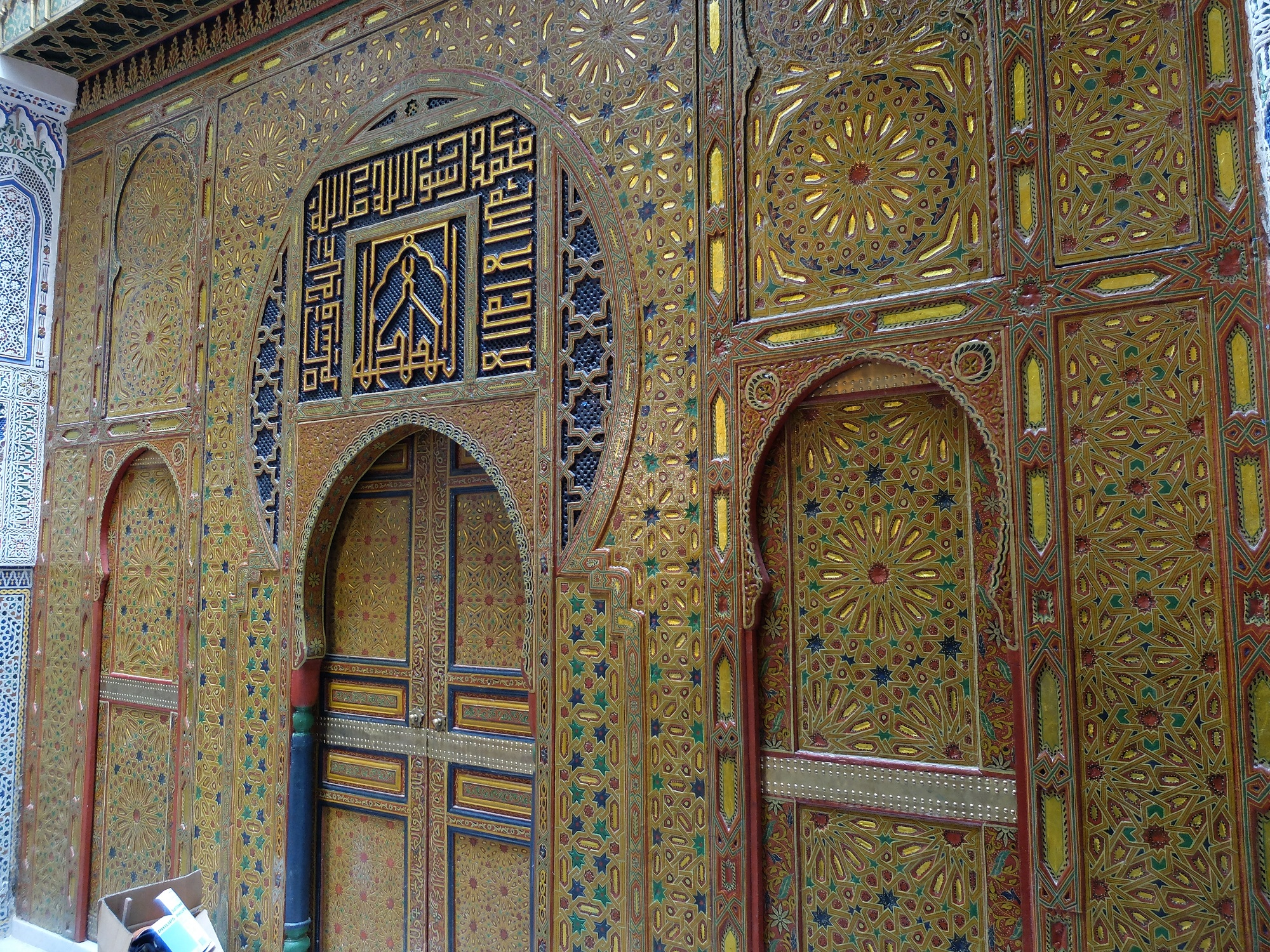
The western doors to the mausoleum, behind which is a vestibule that gives direct access to the mausoleum

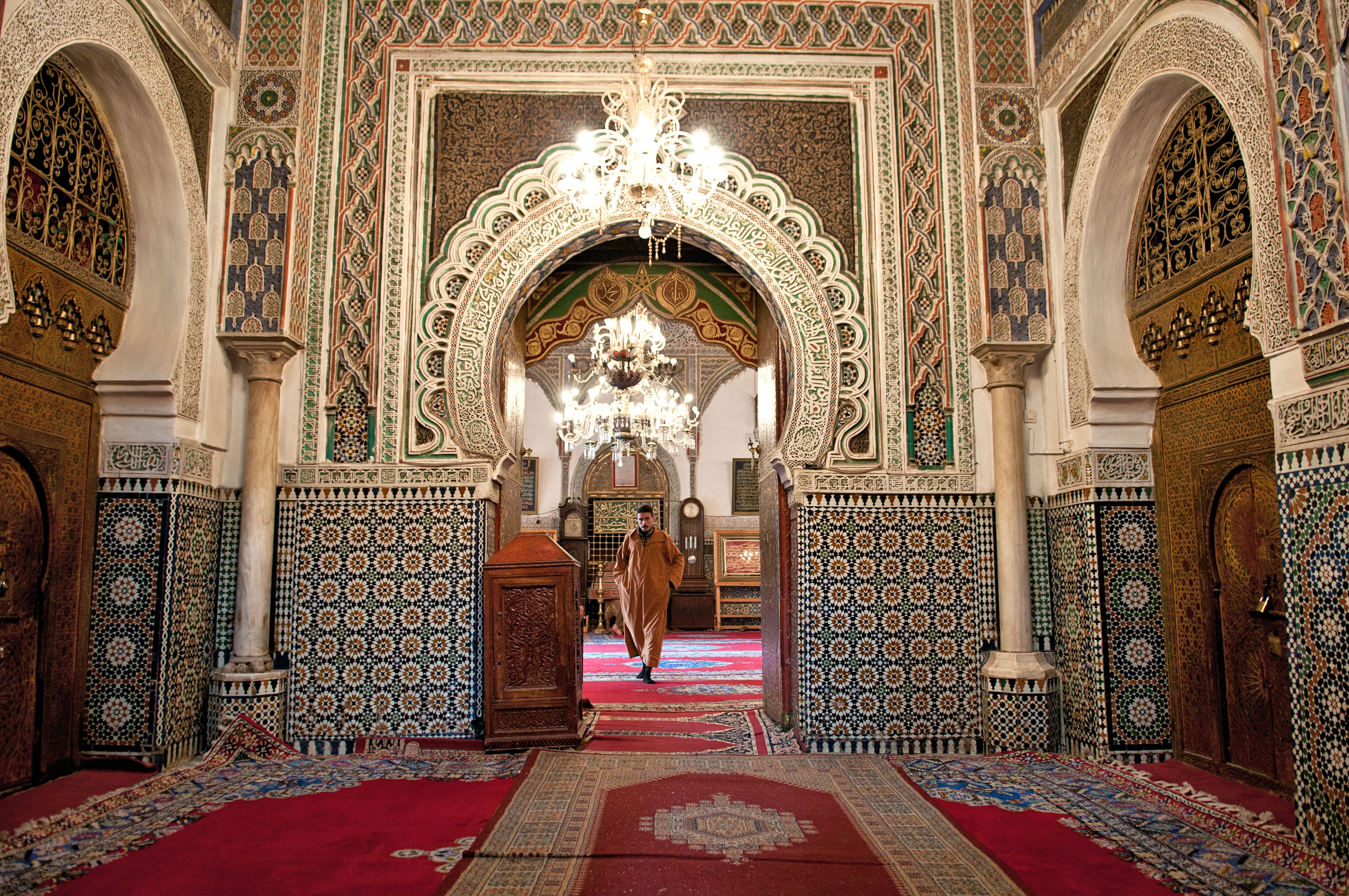
The western vestibule, granting direct access to the mausoleum chamber beyond

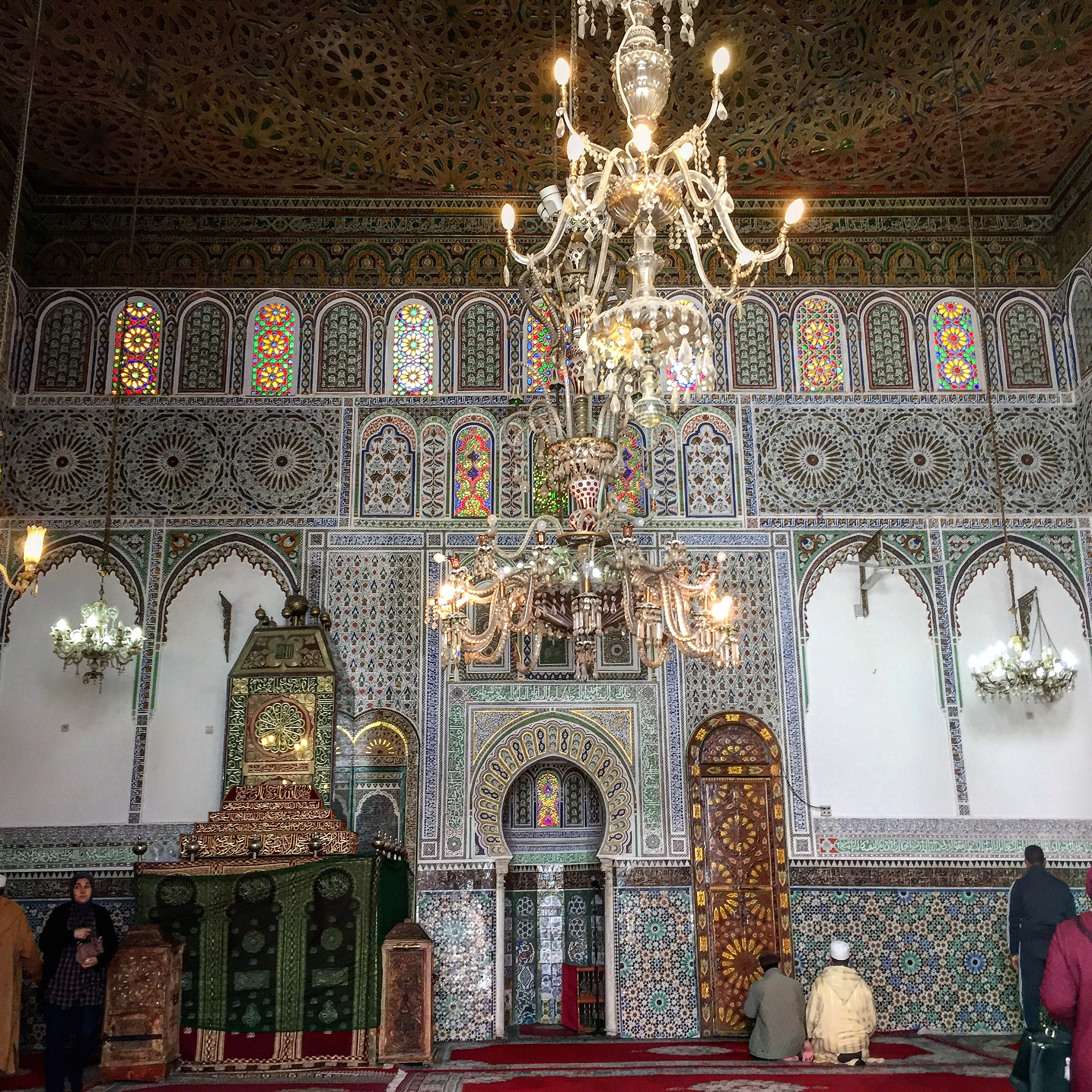
The mausoleum chamber

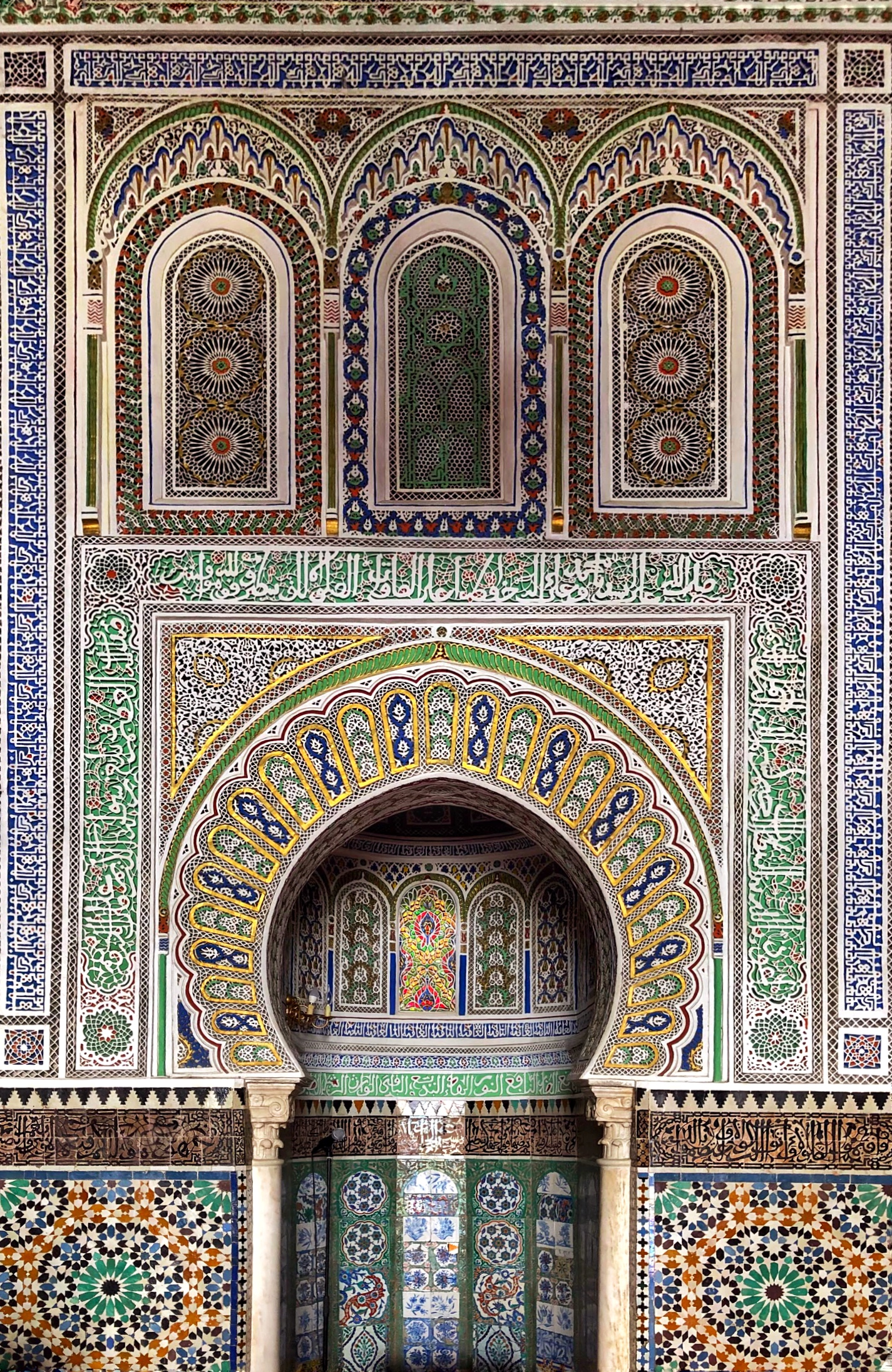
Mihrab of the mausoleum chamber, with stucco and tile decoration

A number of ornate marble columns, capitals, and panels throughout the complex, as well as an ornate marble arch for the window of the muwaqqit's or timekeeper's chamber (Dar al-Muwaqqit) overlooking the courtyard, all appear to be Saadi in origin, probably stripped by Moulay Ismail from Saadi palaces like the famous el-Badi in Marrakech and re-used in new prestigious buildings elsewhere. Another small marble column built into the external southern façade of the mausoleum is likely of Almoravid origin.

There are several smaller entrances and other elements along the outside of the building, usually marked with intricate decoration. Notably, the external south wall of the building features a grilled window which connects directly to the tomb and where passing Muslims can offer short prayers to bless Moulay Idriss II. Next to this, there is also a small slot opening where passersby may give money as zakat (alms) for the zawiya.

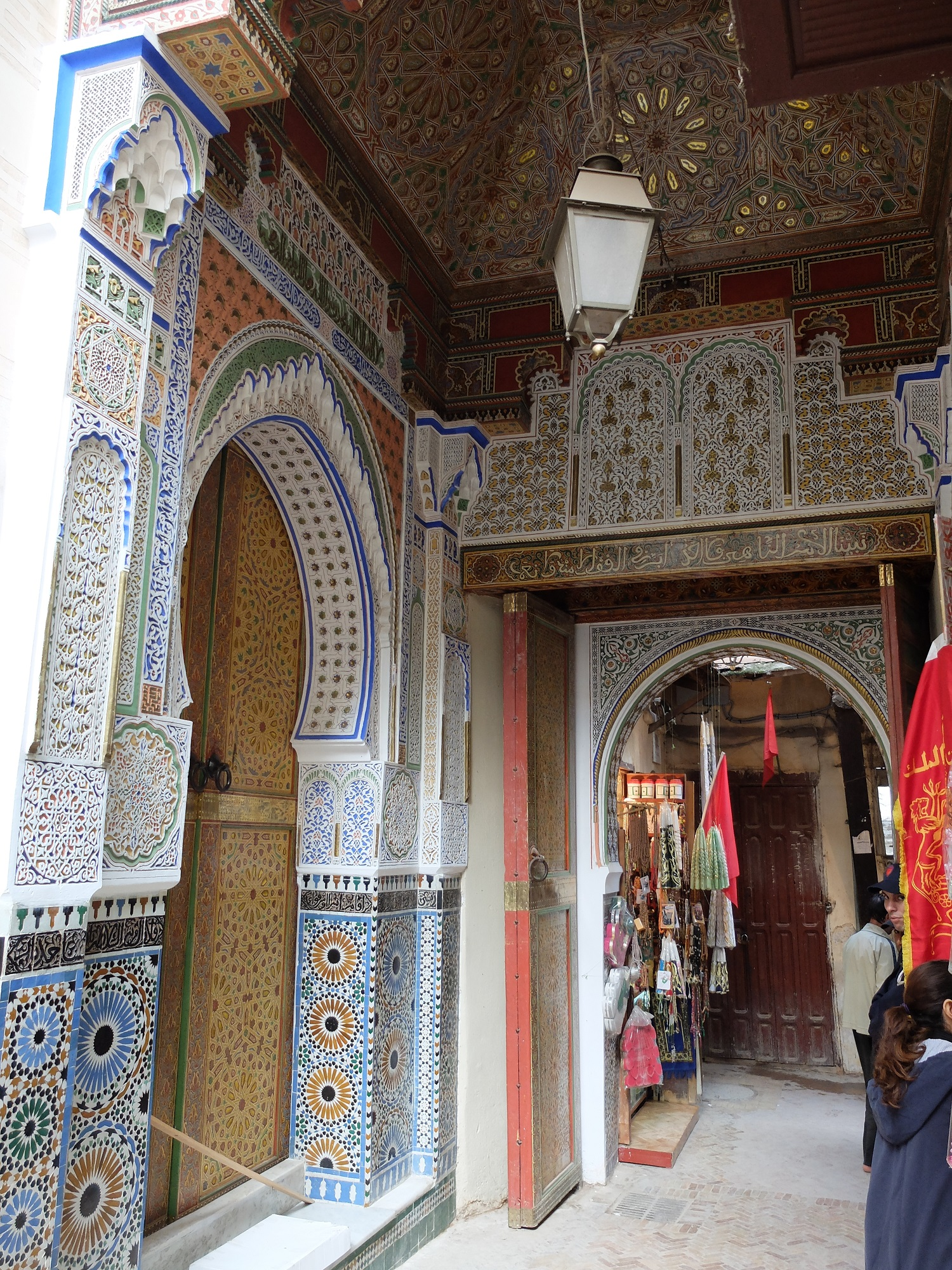
A lesser doorway to the zawiya in its southeastern corner, surrounded by painted wood, carved stucco, and zellij

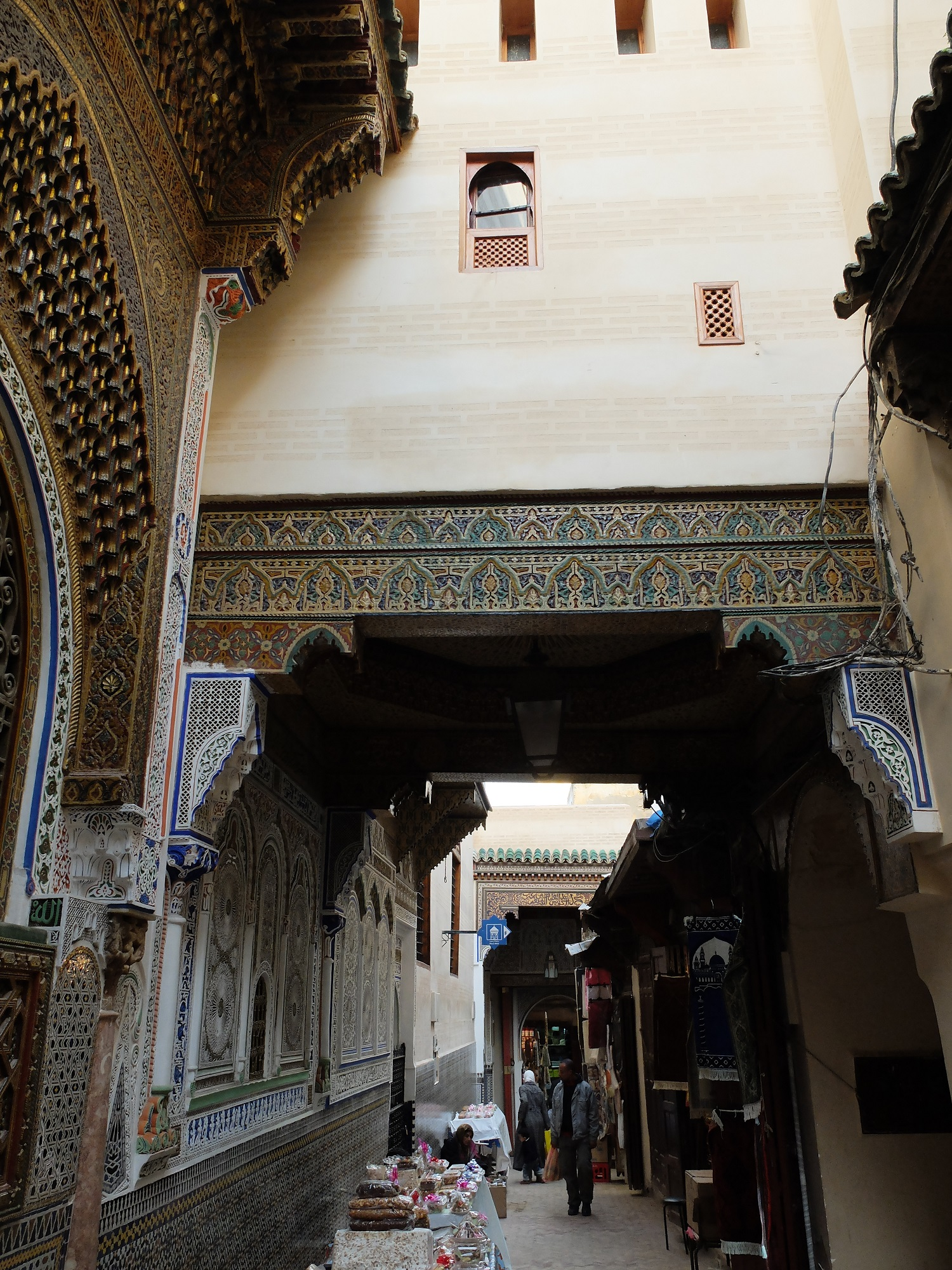
Street on the south side of the zawiya; the bridge or raised passage over the street connects the zawiya building (on the left) directly with the house of the khatib (on the right)

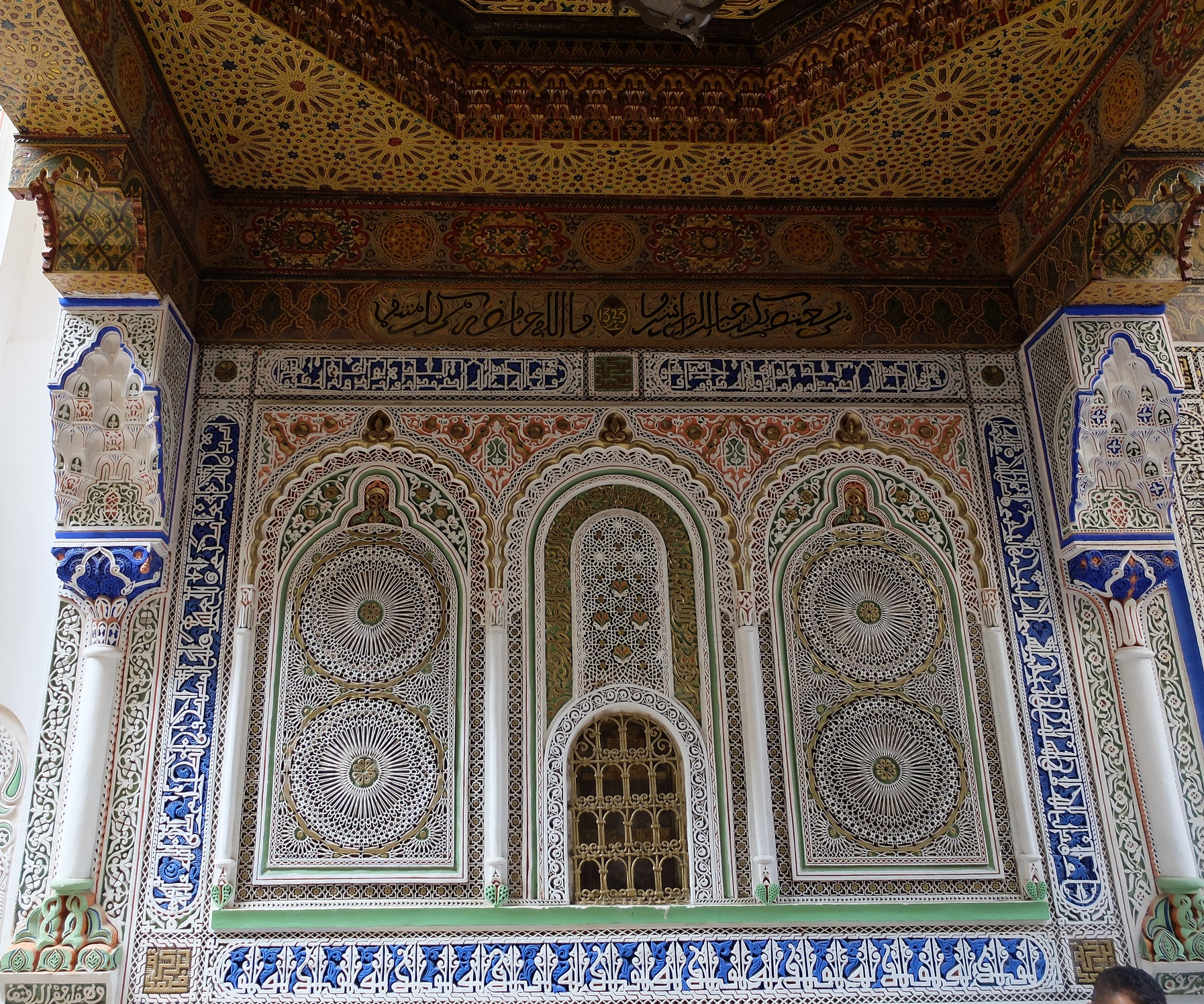
Decoration on the outer wall of the mausoleum, with a grilled window to the tomb (bottom center) where prayers can be offered to Idriss II

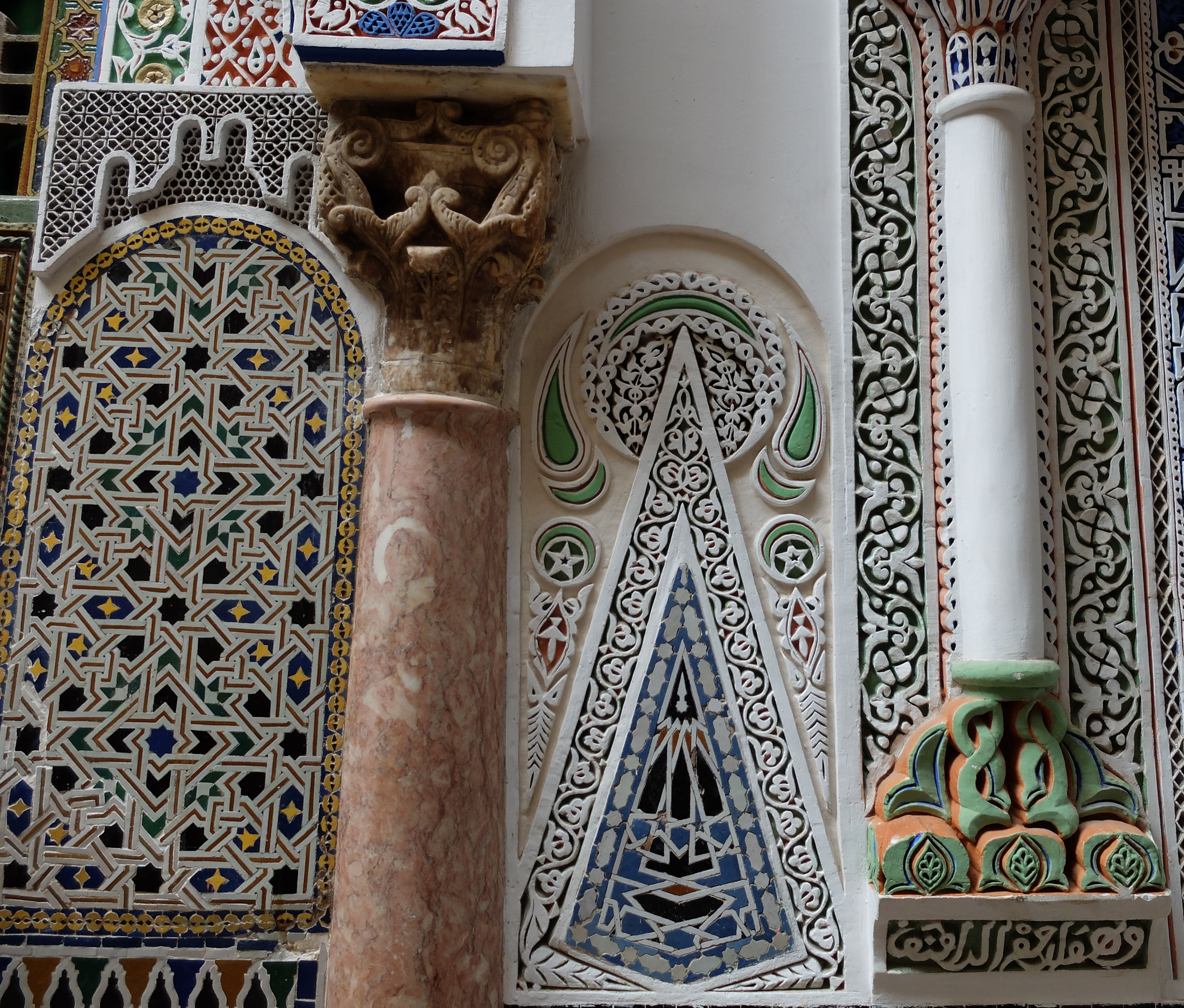
Marble column (left) embedded in the outer south wall of the mausoleum, believed to be a spolia from the Almoravid period

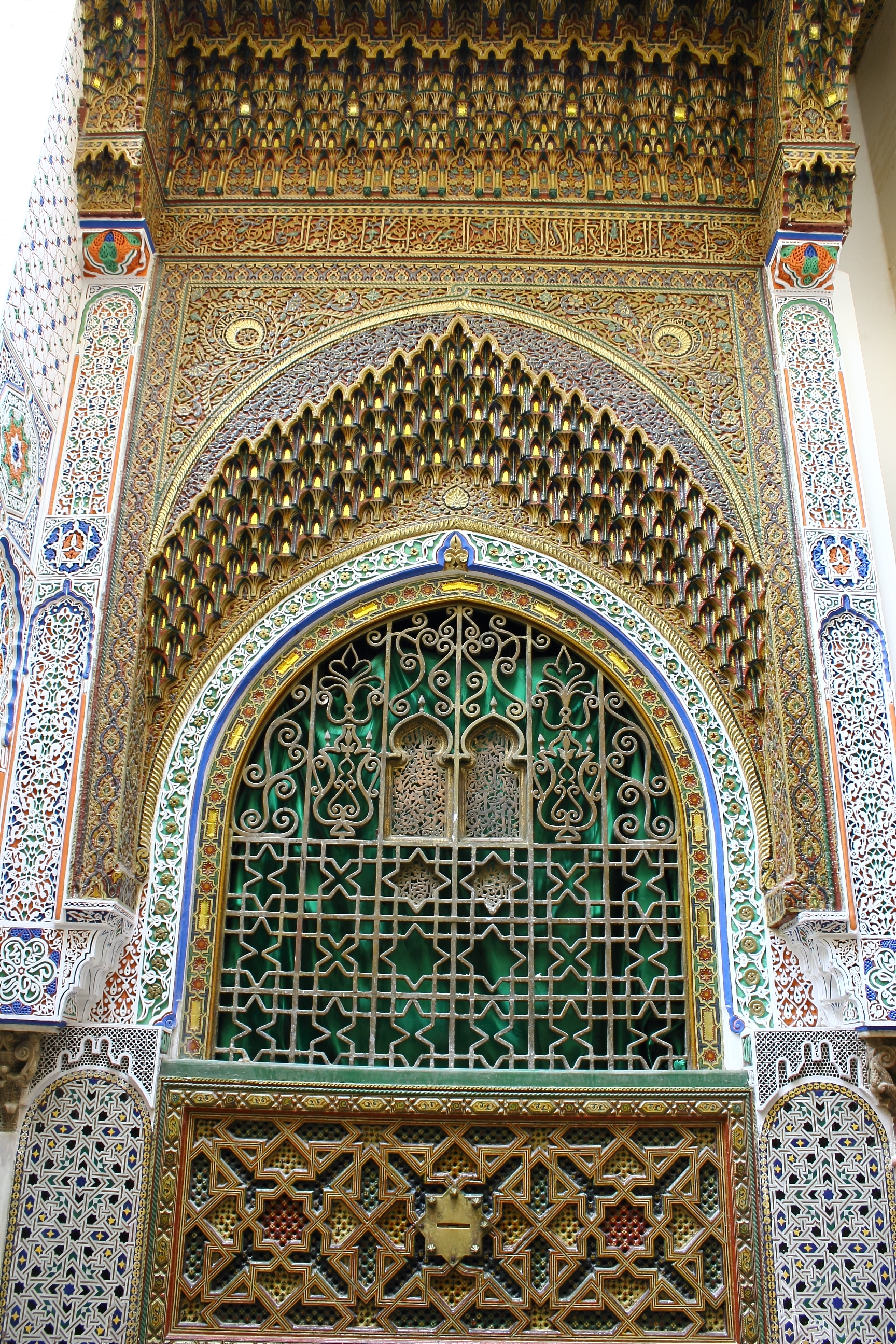
Decoration on the outer south wall of the mausoleum, and a slot opening (bottom) for giving alms

== Religious practices and ceremonies ==
The tomb of Moulay Idris II draws Moroccan visitors and pilgrims from all over the country due to its religious and historical importance, and many still come seeking baraka, or blessings, by touching the tomb. The zawiya has for centuries played a role in the yearly celebration of Mouloud (the anniversary of the Prophet Muhammad's birth), notably as the starting point for the procession of the city's artisans' guilds, which still takes place today.

The moussem of Moulay Idris II is the most important moussem (Sufi religious festival) in the city and one of the most important in Morocco. The festival has taken place for hundreds of years and is sponsored by all the traditional merchant and artisan guilds in the city. Each year, all the guilds march through the city together in a procession that culminates at Idris II's mausoleum. Each guild donates gifts to the zawiya. One of them is the keswa, a large textile decorated with Qur'anic verses, that is draped over Idris II's catafalque. The week of the moussem is also marked by other cultural events and entertainment.

== See also ==
- Lists of mosques
- List of mosques in Africa
- List of mosques in Morocco
