= Muhammad bin Al-Qasim al-Qundusi =

19th-century Sufi scholar

- محمد بن القاسم القندوسي
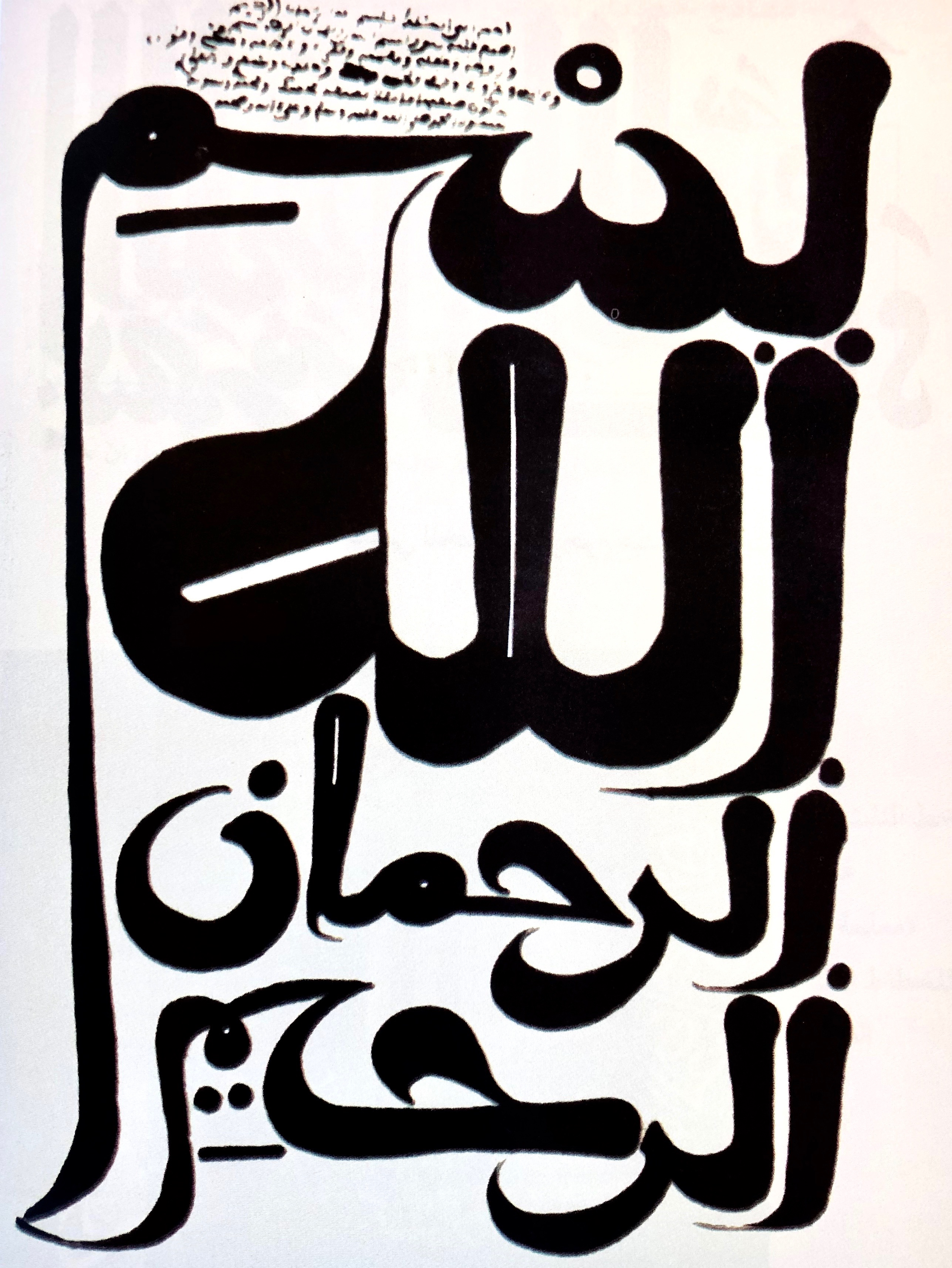
- A Basmala by al-Qundūsi.
- Born: 1790; Kénadsa, southwest Algeria
- Died: 1861 (aged 70–71)
- Known for: Calligraphy

Muhammad Bin Al-Qāsim al-Qundūsi ( Arabic: محمد بن القاسم القندوسي; born c. 1790 – died 1861) was an Algerian Sufi calligrapher and scholar who was born in Qanaadasa in southwest Algeria.

== Biography ==
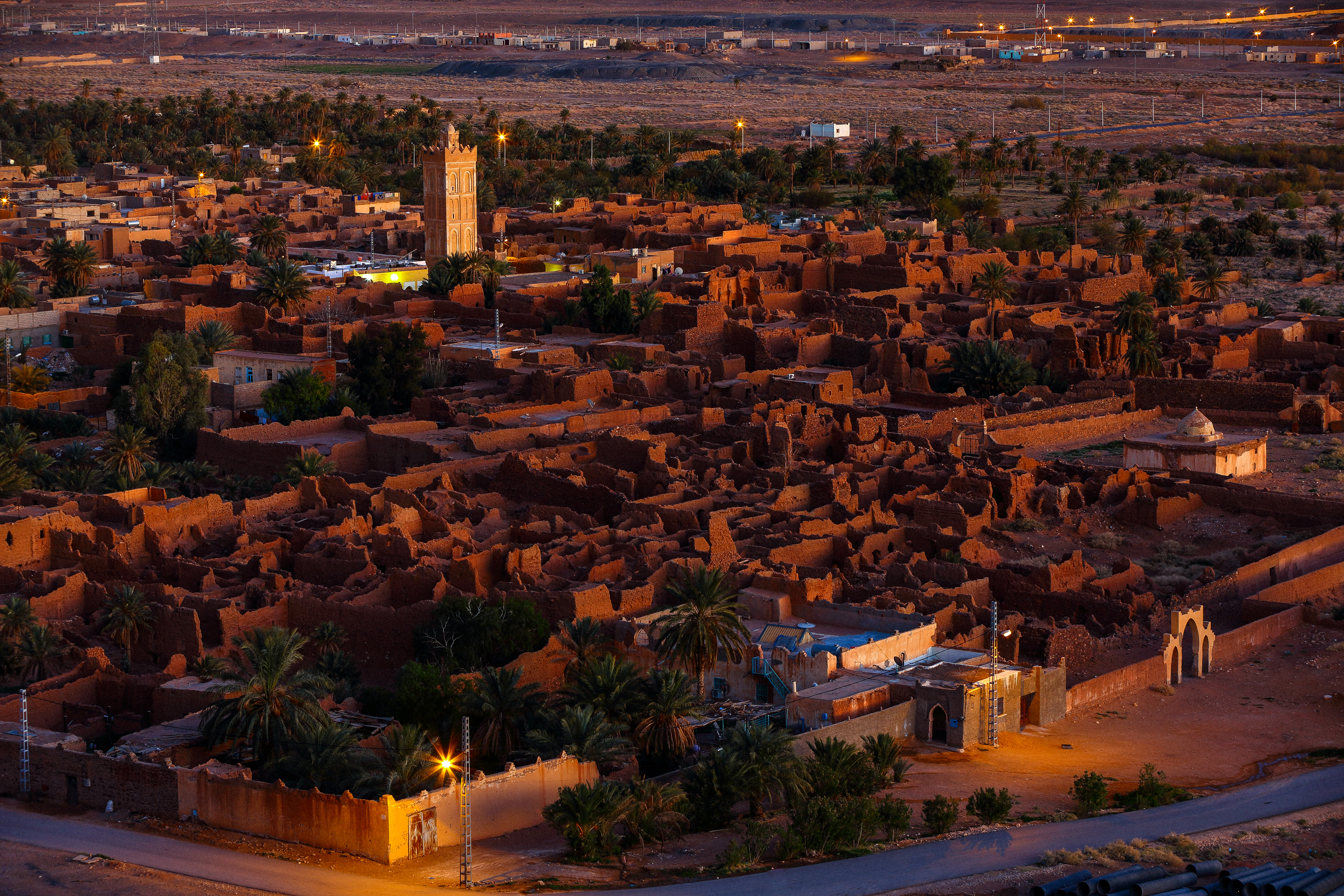
Qanaadasa, Algeria, Muhammad al-Qundusi's birthplace.

Al-Qundusi was born in Qanaadasa in 1790 in southwest Algeria. In 1828, he migrated to Fes, where he lived and had a hanout in the herb market, in which he sold herbs.

He lived in relative obscurity, though those who knew him described him as gnostic, saintly, esoterically knowledgeable, and spiritually insightful.

He wrote many books and transcribed a number of dawawin, or collected works. He conferred upon the Moroccan Alawite Sultan Sliman a degree in knowledge of the Dala'il al-Khayrat, a seminal Sufi text composed by the 15th-century Muhammad al-Jazuli. al-Qundusi died in 1861.

He was a Sufi associated with the Qadiri and Nasiri orders.

== Calligraphy ==
He was a talented calligrapher, specializing in a flamboyant style of the Maghrebi script that he innovated. He also created a copy of the Quran in 12 volumes which he finished on September 7–8, 1850, and which is kept in al-Khizāna al-Ḥassania. He drew the name of Allah in the Zawiya of Idriss II in Fes.

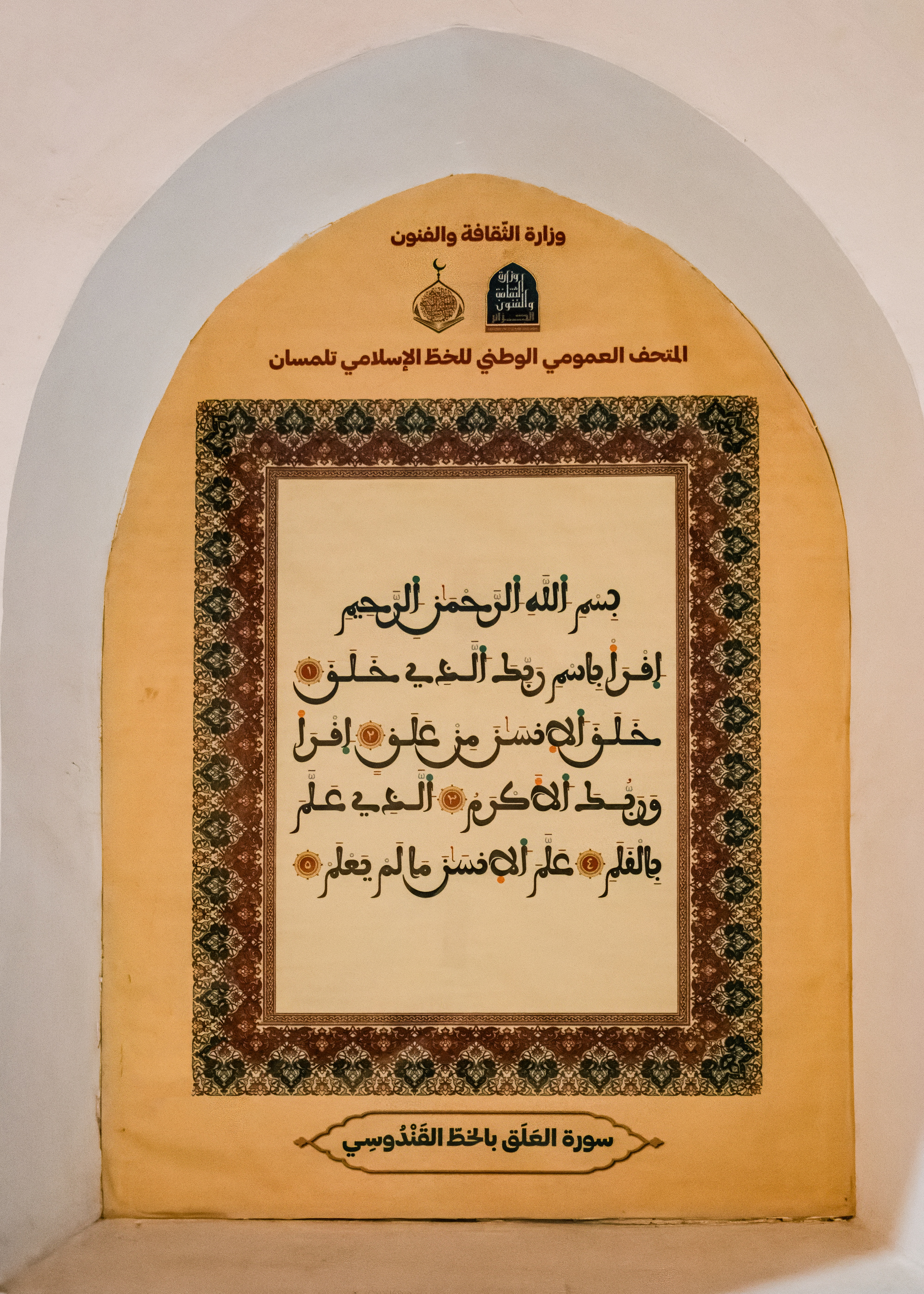
Surah Al-'Alaq of the Quran written with Al-Qundusi calligraphy, Islamic Calligraphy Museum of Tlemcen.

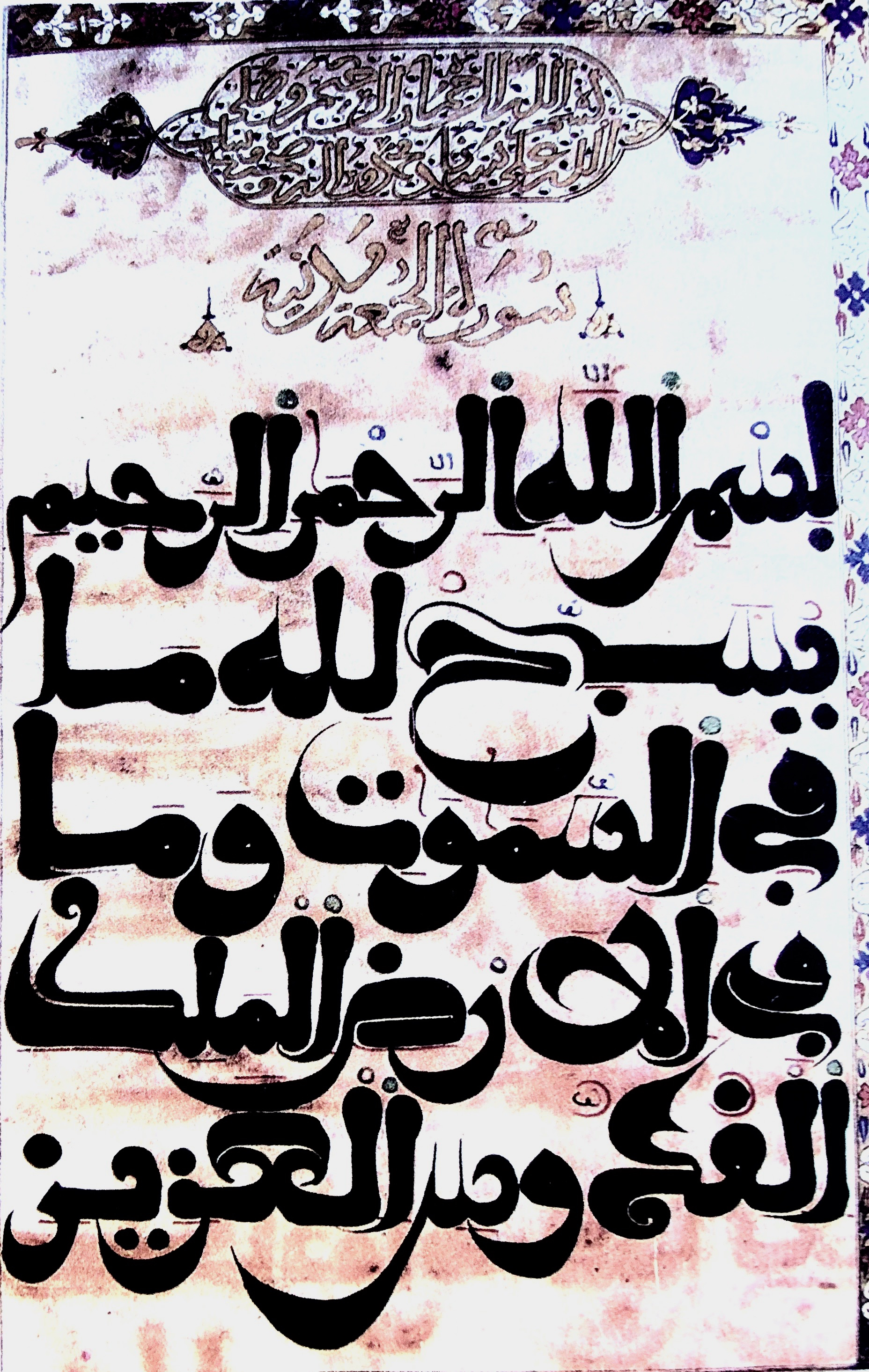

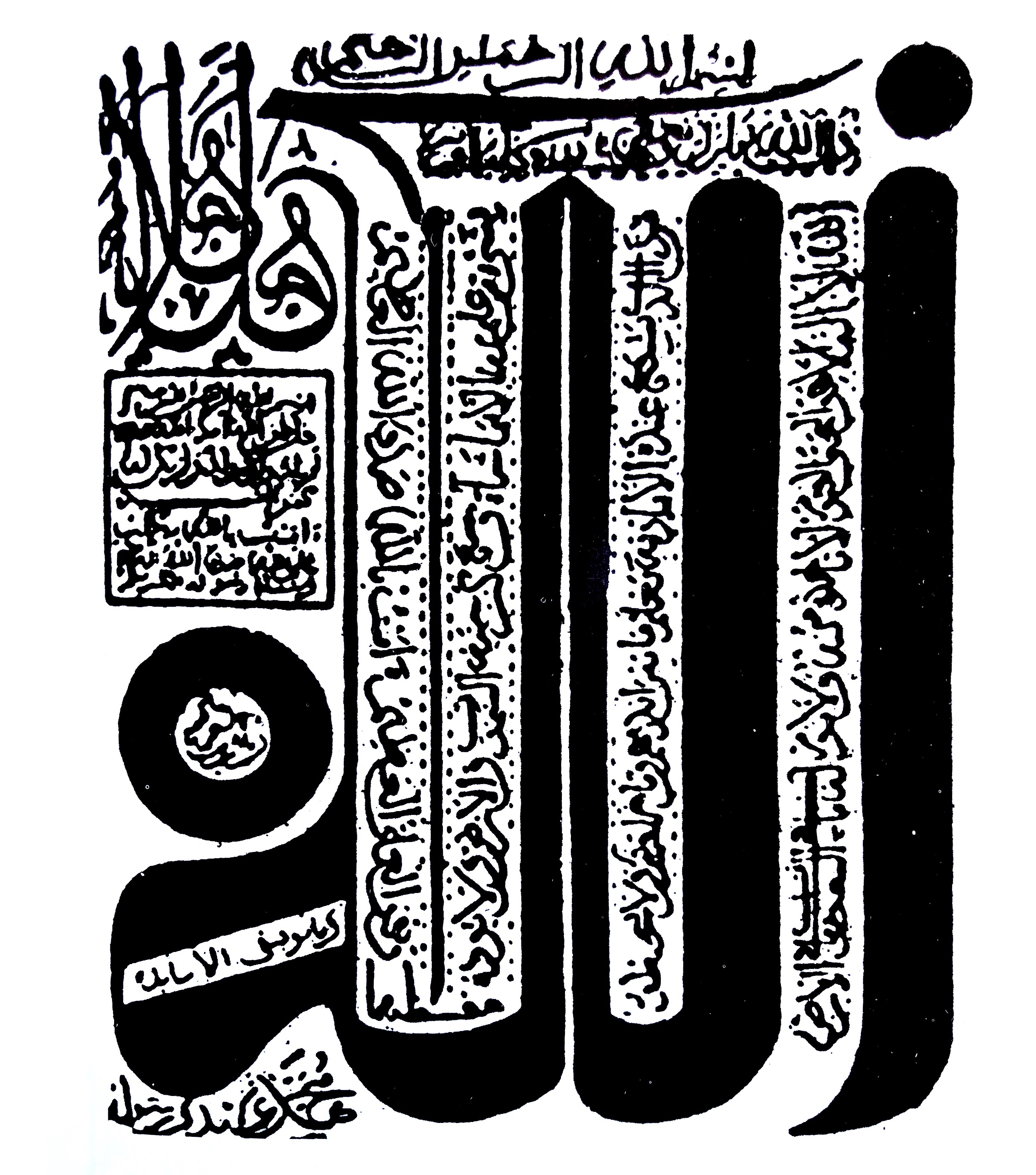

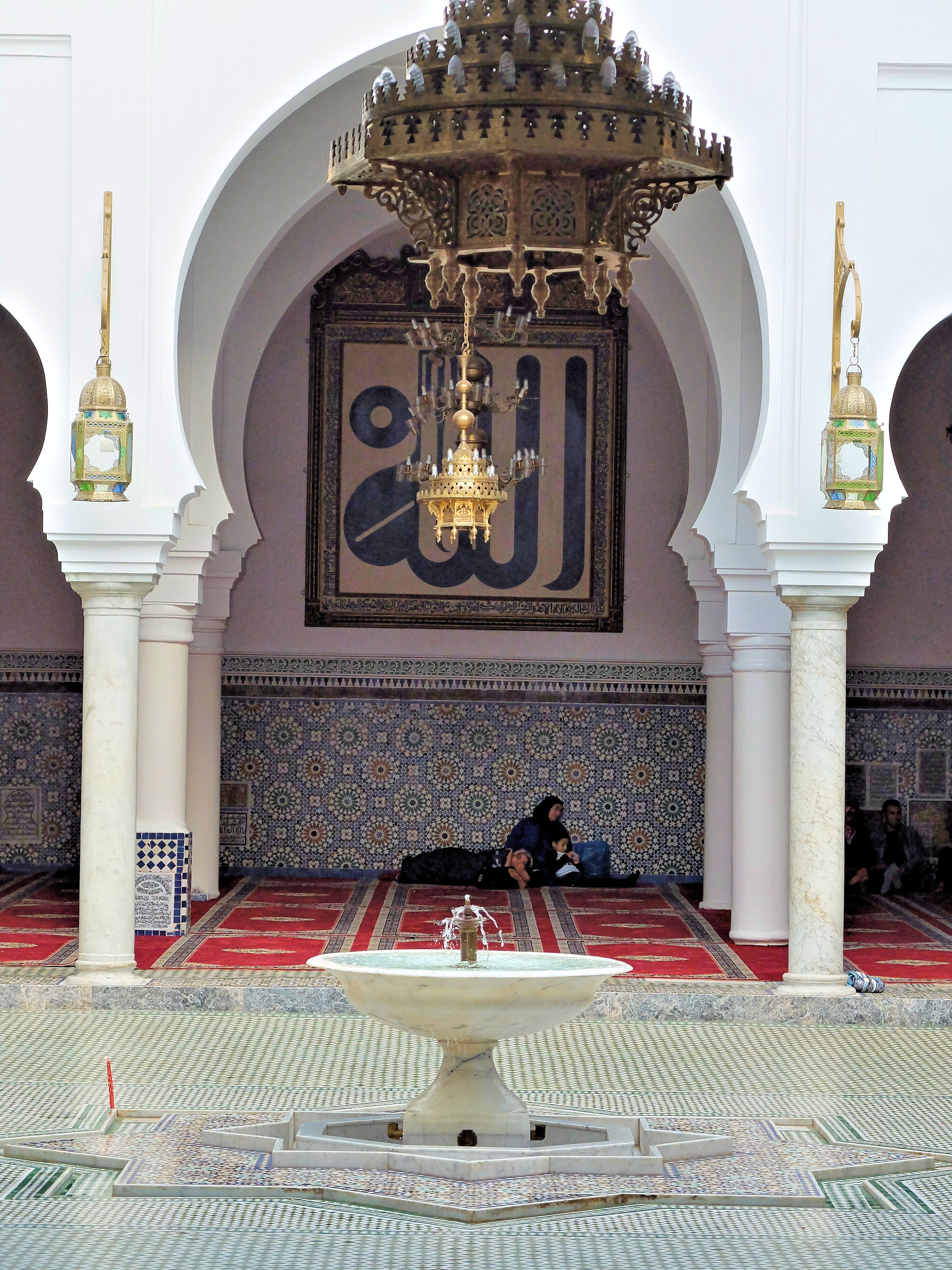
A composition of the name Allah by al-Qundusi displayed at the Zawiya of Moulay Idris II in Fes.

== Works ==
His works include:

- التأسيس في مساوي الدنيا ومهاوي إبليس. completed 1838
- البوارق الأحمدية في الحركة والسكونية
- الصلاة الوافية من الأحوال الظلمانية
- التلوين والتمكين في مطلع الصلاة على صاحب الوحي المبين completed 1852
- The Drink of the People of Purity in Prayers upon the Chosen Prophet (or شراب أهل الصفا في الصلاة على النبي المصطفى), also known as طريق المعراج إلى حضرة صاحب التاج completed in 1838
- The Grand Elixir of Invocations سيف العناية لمريد الكفاية
  - تقاييد في الاسم اللطيف
  - مختصر في أسماء الله الحسنى

== Legacy ==
Most of his works are now kept at the national library in Rabat.

His works inspired a typeface called Qandus, which was designed by Kristyan Sarkis of TPTQ Arabic, and won the Type Directors Club's 2017 Typeface Design Award.
