= Kissariat al-Kifah =

Bazaar in Fez, Morocco

Coordinates: 34°03′53.8″N 4°58′27.4″W

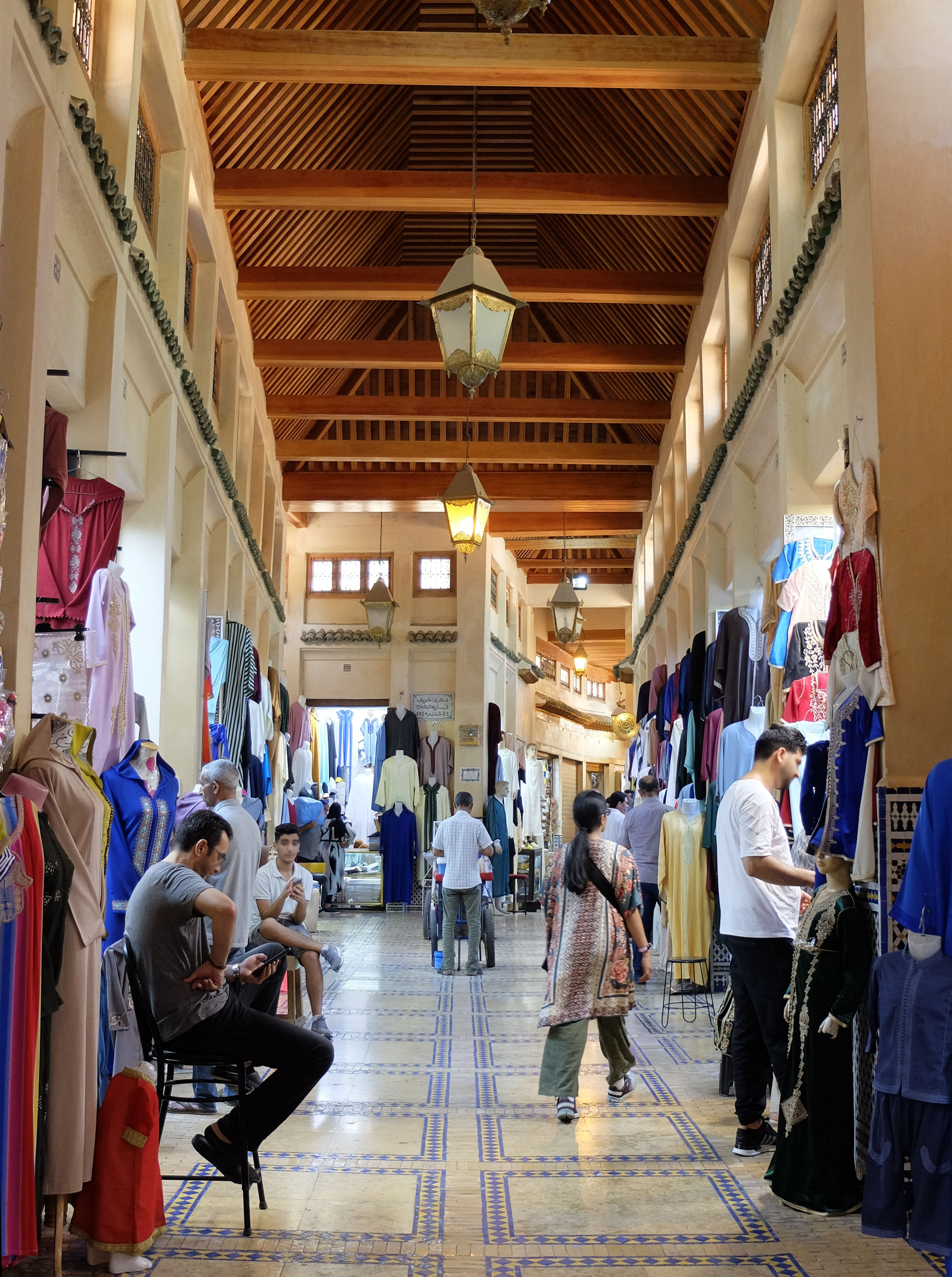
Street and shops inside the Kissaria (2023 photo)

The Kissariat al-Kifah (Arabic: قيسارية الكفاح) or Kissaria (القيسارية) is the historic central bazaar of Fes el-Bali, the historic old city of Fez, Morocco. It is located between the Zawiya of Moulay Idris II and the Qarawiyyin Mosque.

== History ==
The bazaar has been established here since the early Idrisid period of the city (9th-10th centuries). However, its streets and houses were rebuilt at least once after the double devastation of a fire in 1324 and a flood in 1325. Since the 15th century, the bazaar was situated inside what the Muslims of the city considered the horm (sacred sanctuary) of the nearby Zawiya of Moulay Idris II. Accordingly, non-Muslims and animals were traditionally not allowed to enter this area – at least in theory, and especially during times of religious tension. In the mid-15th century, some Fessi Jewish merchant families, such as the Bannānī, Ibn Shaqrūn, Bannīs, Barrāda, and Gassūs families—converted to Islam in order to preserve their businesses and livelihoods tied to commerce in the central market. This group of new Muslims were referred to as the Bildiyīn (Note: The term Bildiyīn has also been used to refer to Toshavim, or autochthonous Amazigh and Arabized Jews, as opposed to Megorashim, or Sephardic immigrants from Iberia.) (بلديين 'locals' or 'natives') as they did not have a traditional Arabic nisba.

After another fire in modern times, probably in 1918, the former wooden roof was replaced with a flat roofing made of reeds, similar to that found in some other North African cities of the time. Roger Le Tourneau, a French historian who published a history of pre-colonial Fez in 1949, noted that the shops of the Kissaria had a slightly more luxurious appearance than those of other market streets in the city, with their wooden shutters sometimes carved with decorative lines or their ceilings sometimes painted.

Further renovations in the 20th century replaced the reed roofs with flat concrete roofs. The most recent renovations, in 2016 and 2017, replaced the street roofs with new wooden roofs, made various repairs and practical improvements, and added tile decoration along the lower walls.

Appearance of the Kissaria over time

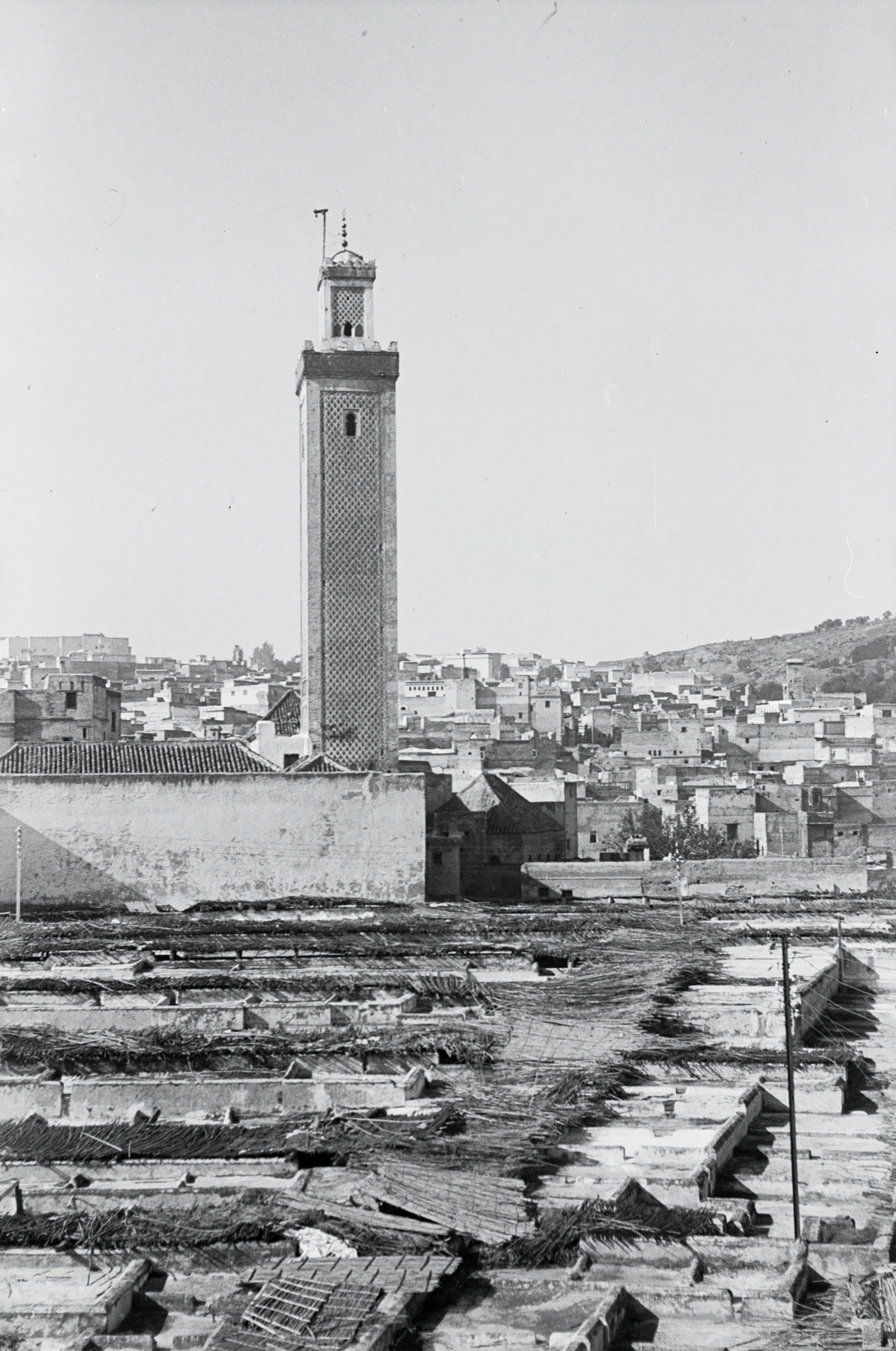
Rooftop view of the Kissaria in 1932, with reed roofs over the streets. The Zawiya of Idris II stands in the background.

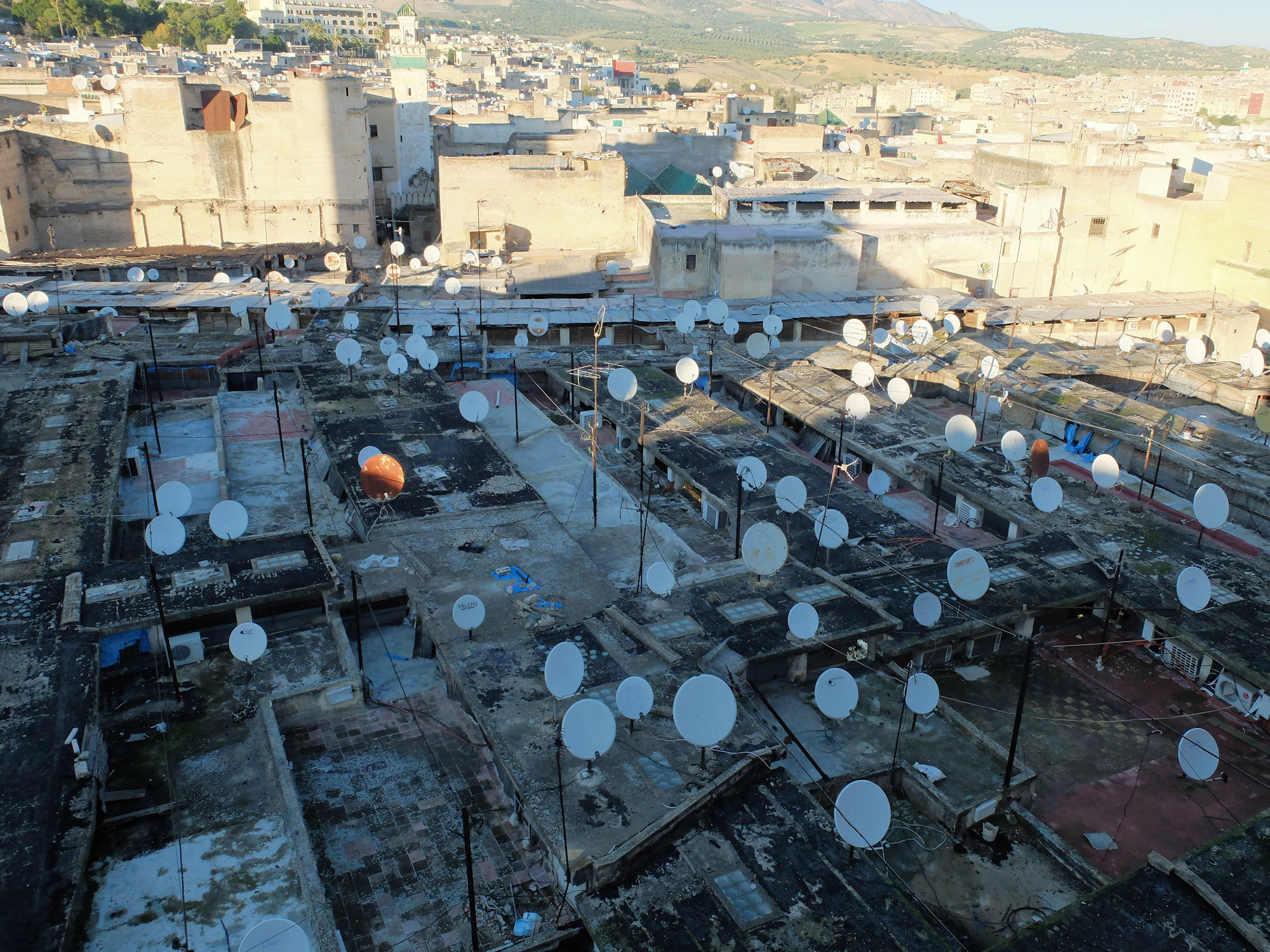
Rooftop view of the Kissaria in 2014, prior to recent renovations, with flat concrete roofs

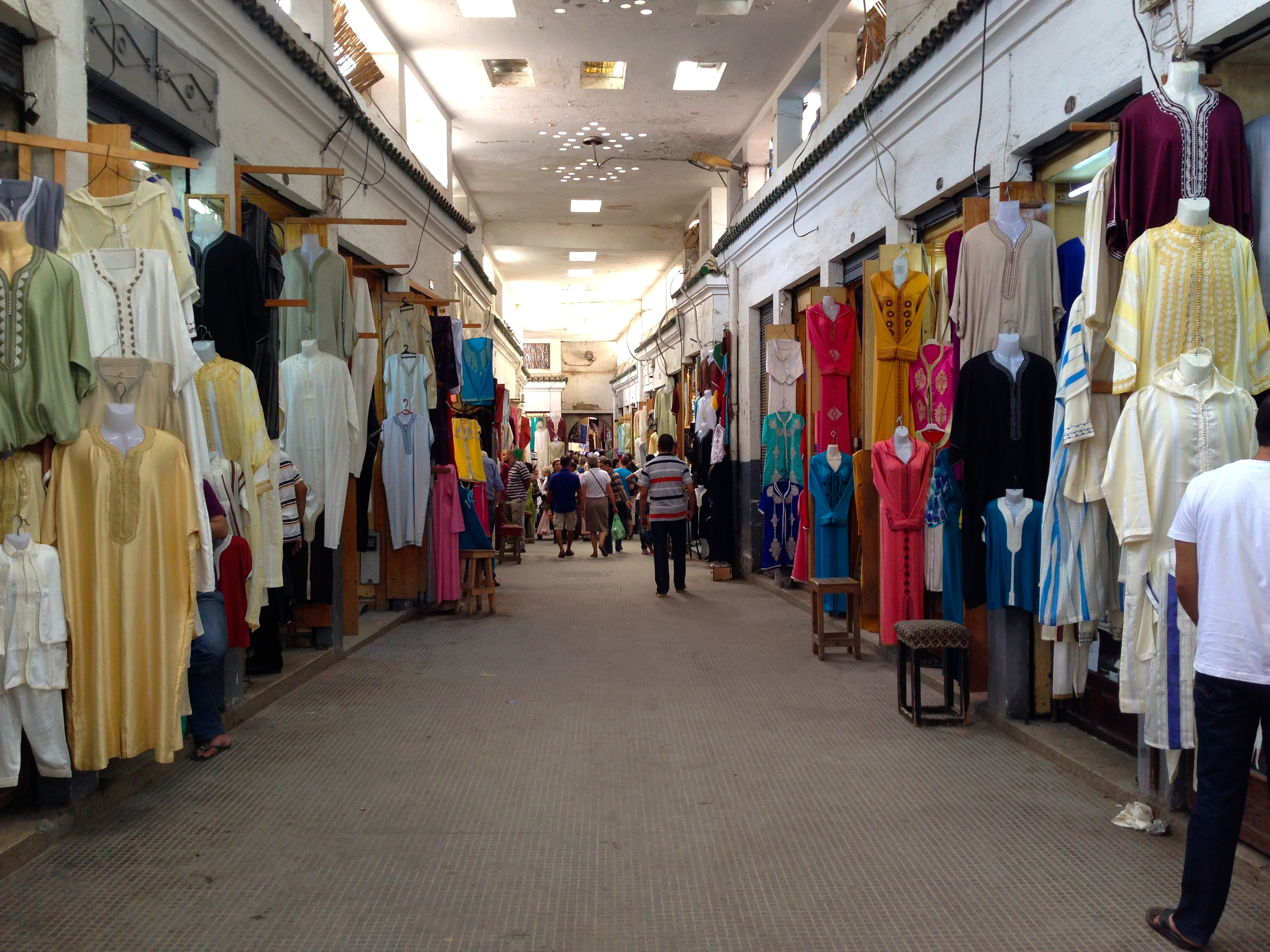
View of a street inside the Kissaria in 2014, prior to recent renovations

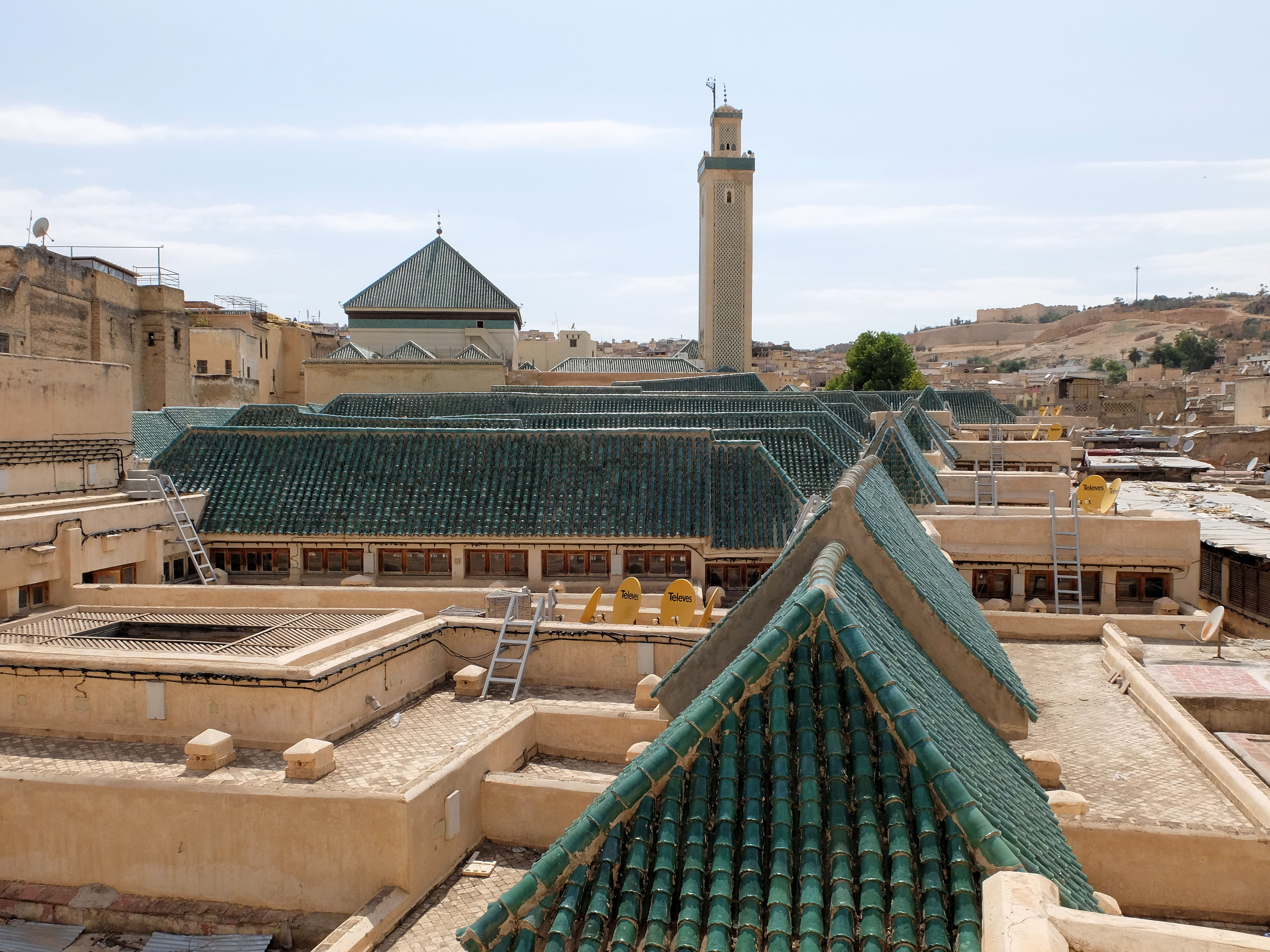
Rooftop view of the Kissaria in 2023, after recent renovations, with sloped wooden roofs covered in green tiles

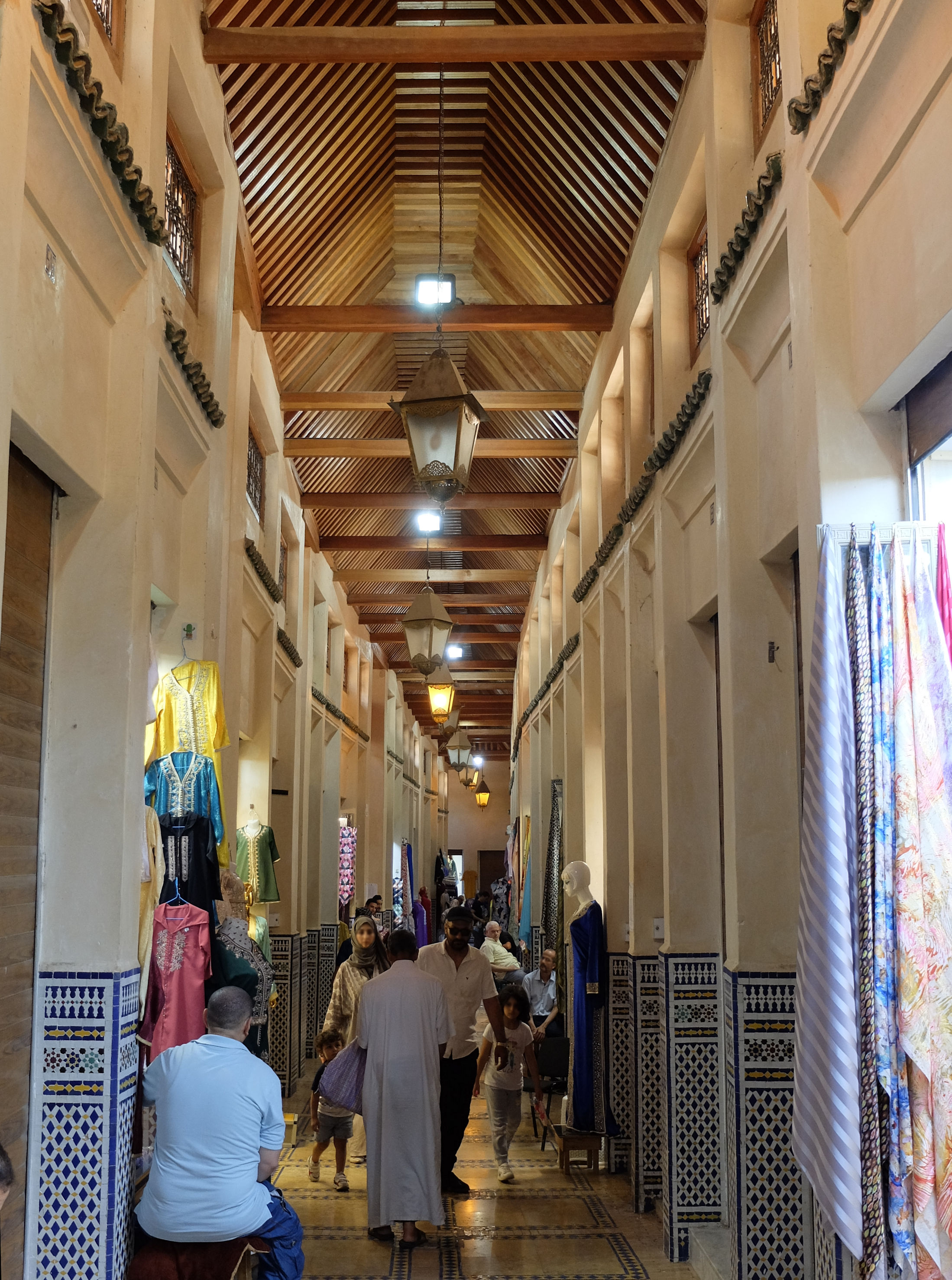
View of a street inside the Kissaria in 2023, after recent renovations

== Layout and function ==
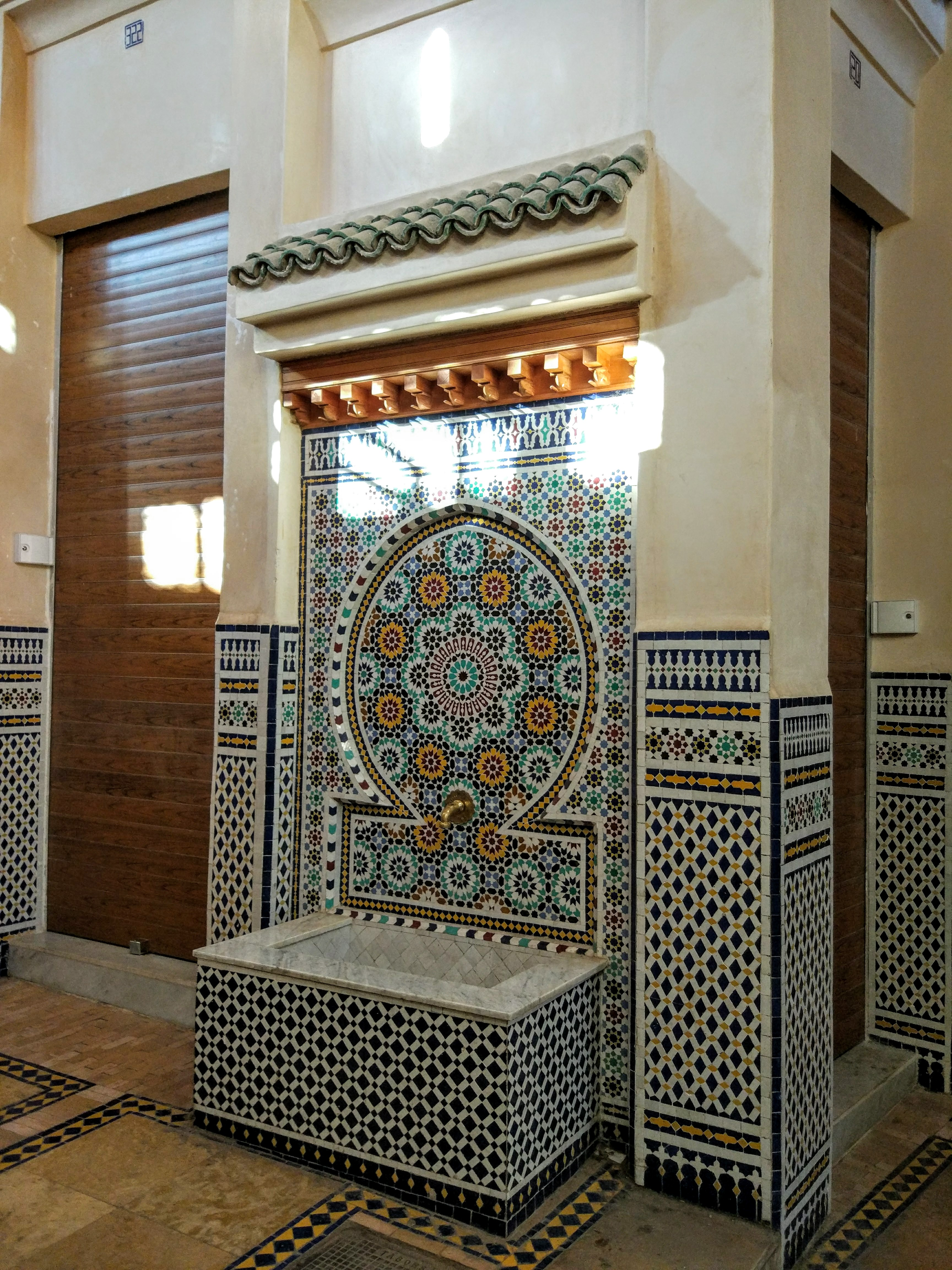
A fountain decorated with zellij in the Kissaria (after the recent renovations)

The Kissaria (a term also used in other parts of the Islamic world and also transliterated from Arabic as qaysariyya) is interconnected with the Souq al-'Attarin and consists of a close network of lanes and alleys which are filled with hundreds of shops. It is only one part of a larger commercial district and of a network of souqs (markets) across the city, but was traditionally the most prestigious and most central commercial complex, where the most luxurious goods were sold. This arrangement of a planned bazaar at heart of the city, near its most important religious and civic monuments, was typical of many major cities in the Islamic world.

Unlike most markets in historic Fes, the Kissaria consists of a grid-like network of streets roughly parallel or perpendicular to each other, completely filled with shops and without any residential structures. It is delimited to the north by the Souq al-'Attarin, to the east by the street bordering the Qarawiyyin Mosque, to the west by the Zawiya of Moulay Idris II, and to the south by the Souq al-Shamma'in. A number of funduqs (merchant inns and warehouses) are also found nearby, such as the Funduq al-Shamma'in.

Traditionally, different streets or sections of streets in the bazaar were specialized for different products, such as clothes, silks, babouches (traditional slippers), and jewelry. Some goods were sold by auctions that took place at specific times of the day. Historically, every entrance to the Kissaria was also equipped with doors that were shut and locked at night to protect the merchandise inside. Only the porters (zerzaya) were allowed to remain here overnight in order to patrol the streets.
