= Tala'a Kebira =

Street in Fez, Morocco

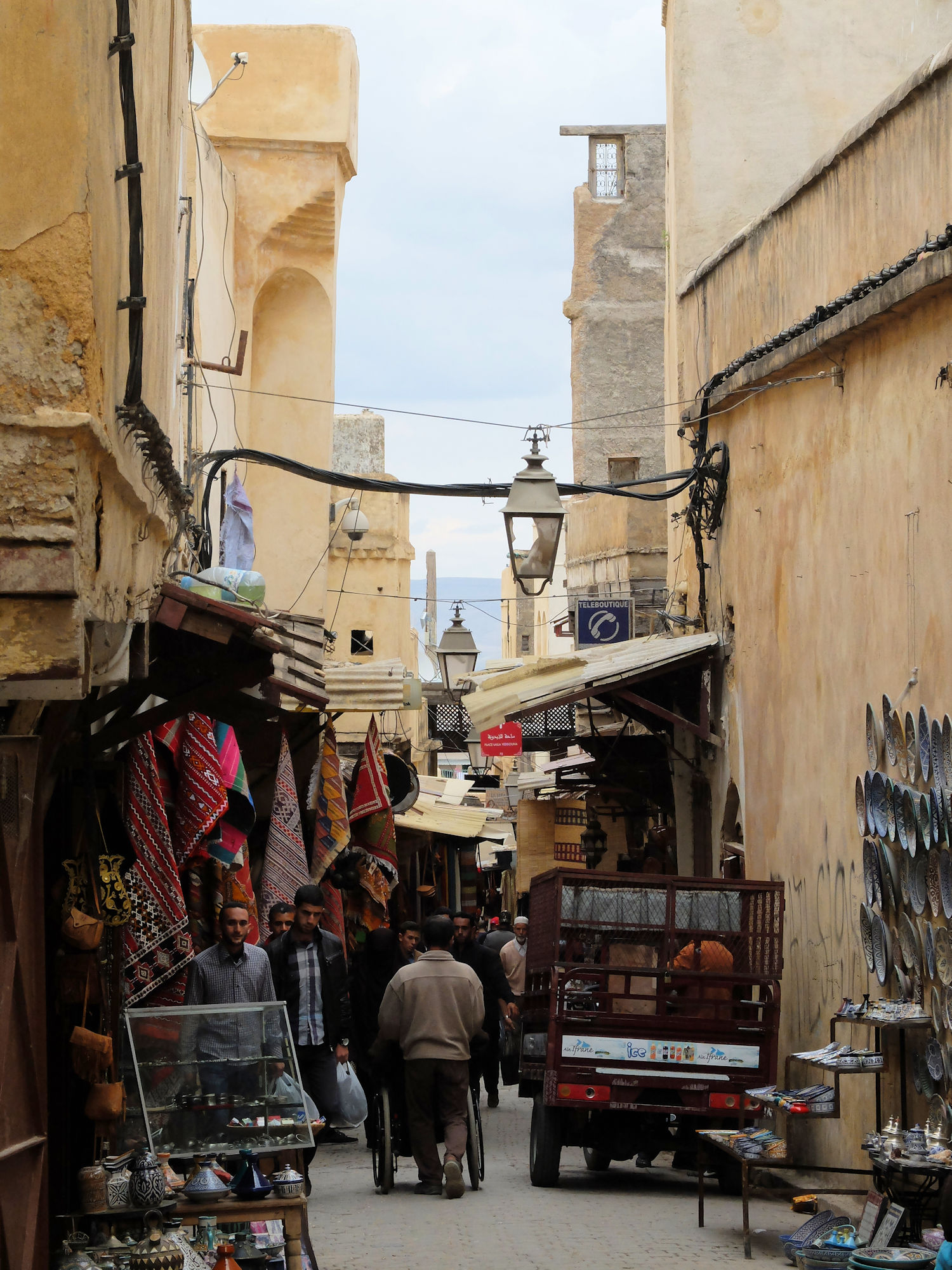
Scene along Tala'a Kebira. The street has shops along most of its length.

Tala'a Kebira (alternate spellings include Talaa Kbira, Tala'a al-Kbira, etc) (Arabic: الطالعة الكبيرة, 'the Great Slope/Climb') is one of the longest and most important streets in Fes el-Bali, the old city (medina) of Fes, Morocco. The street runs roughly east to west, starting near the Bab Bou Jeloud and Bab Mahrouk gates in the west and ending at the al-Attarine Madrasa in the east, near the Qarawiyyin Mosque. It constitutes one of the main souq streets in the old city (including the Souq al-Attarine, which occupies its eastern end) and a number of important historic monuments are built along it.

== Background: the main streets of Fes el-Bali ==
The street is historically the main souk (market) street of Fes. Another street, Tala'a Seghira, serves a similar role and runs more or less parallel to Tala'a Kebira: from Bab Bou Jeloud in the west until rejoining Tala'a Kebira in the Ain Allou area in the east between the Chrabliyine Mosque and Place Nejjarine. Although Tala'a Kebira is one of the broadest and straightest streets across the medina, like other streets in the old city its path is partly determined by the terrain of the valley in which Fes was built. As a result, it still bends and winds to some extent in order to follow a gentler slope where possible.

As in many medieval Islamic cities, the main souk streets of Fes typically run from the city's main gates to the area of the city's main mosque (in this case the Qarawiyyin and, to a lesser extent, the Zawiya of Moulay Idris II, historically known as the Shurafa Mosque), which, in turn, lies at the center of the city's main commercial and economic zones. The souk streets themselves constitute the main commercial axes of the city and are home to most of its foundouks (inns for merchants). As a result, merchants and foreign visitors rarely had need to wander outside these areas and most of the streets branching off them lead only to local residential lanes (often called derbs), many of them leading to dead-ends. Even today, tourists are generally found only on these main commercial thoroughfares. The city's most important monuments and institutions are also located on or near its main souk streets.

== Description of the street: from west to east ==
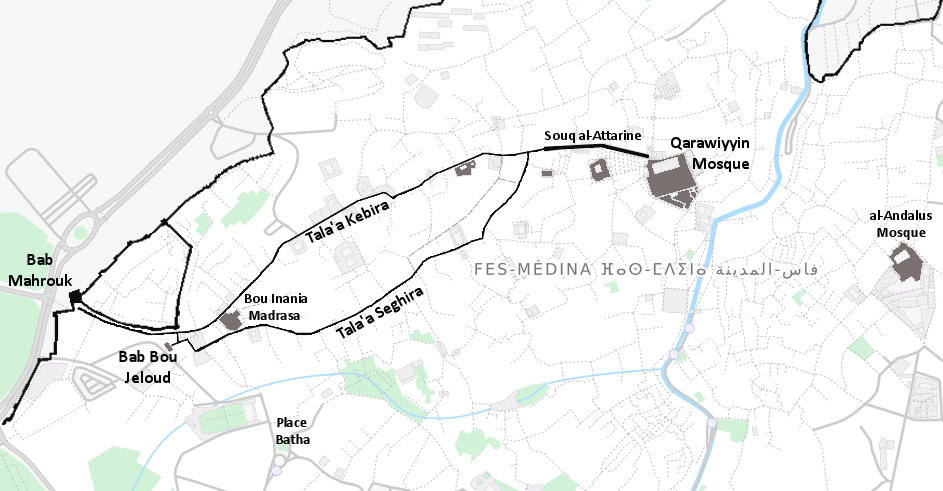
Outlines of Tala'a Kebira and Tala'a Seghira in Fes el-Bali.

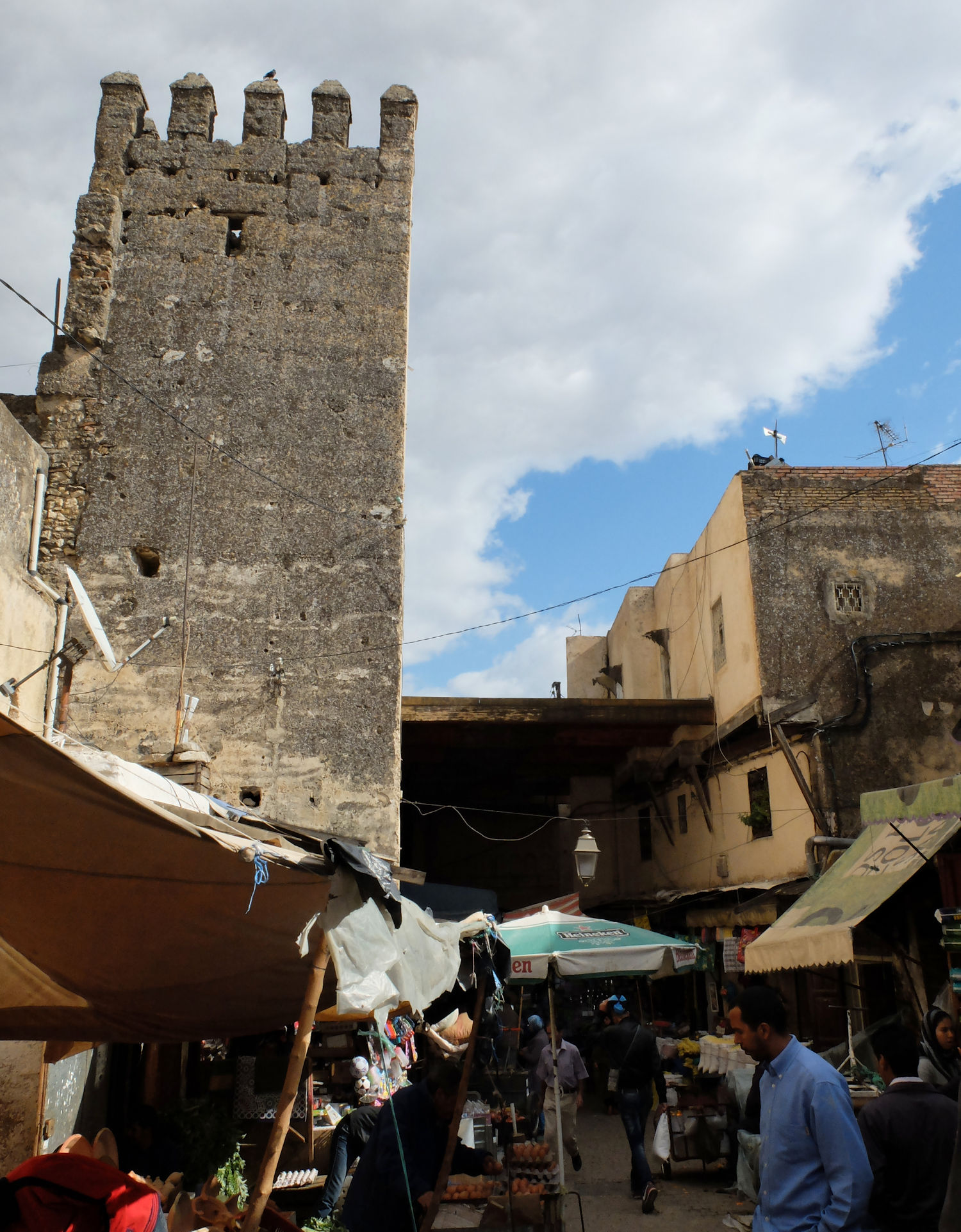
The beginning of Tala'a Kebira. On the left is a tower belonging to the Kasbah an-Nouar.

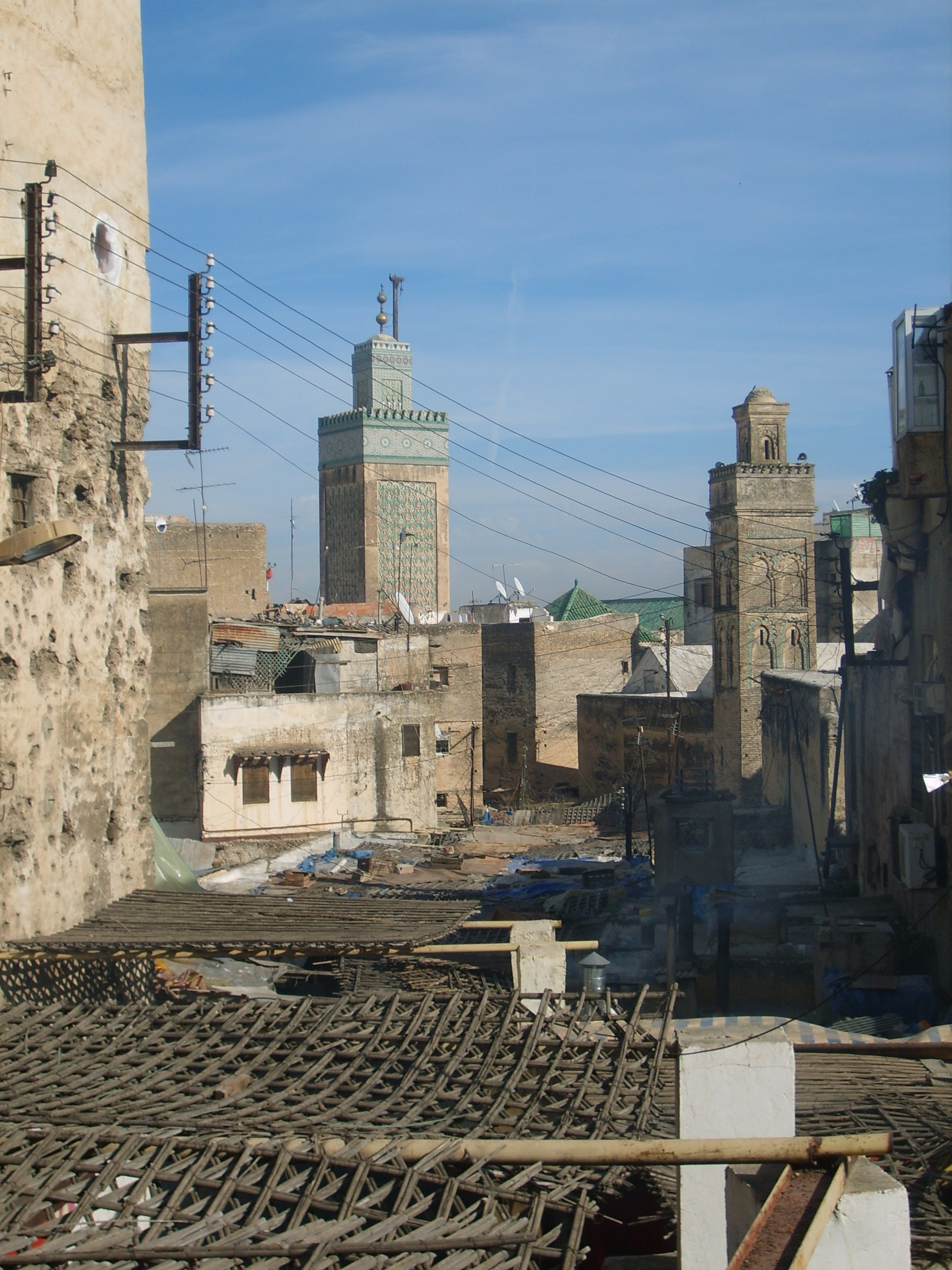
View of Tala'a Kebira near Bab Bou Jeloud, from above the street roofing. The visible minarets are those of the Bou Inania Madrasa (left) and the Sidi Lazzaz Mosque (right).

=== From Bab Bou Jeloud to Ain Allou ===
At its western end, Tala'a Kebira theoretically begins at, or is aligned with, Bab Mahrouk (historically the main western gate of the city) and passes in front of the southern walls of the Kasbah an-Nouar on the northern edge of Place Bou Jeloud. The street can be entered directly from here today. Practically, however, the street begins in earnest at the eastern corner of the Kasbah an-Nouar, near Bab Bou Jeloud. The original Bab Bou Jeloud, a simple and modest gate (still visible but closed today), opened sideways onto the street on its south side. Today, one can enter Tala'a Kebira from a passage off the north side of the square behind the current (early 20th-century) monumental Bou Jeloud gate.

This western end of the street is taken up largely by produce markets, butchers, and other food shops. The street is covered for much of this section. As one walks eastwards from here, the first mosque along the street is the Sidi Lazzaz Mosque on the right, whose minaret is visible when looking through the arch of Bab Bou Jeloud. Soon after, the street opens up above and arrives at the Bou Inania Madrasa on the right, whose entrance is sheltered by an arched roof or bridge over the street, while the Dar al-Magana faces it on the left.

Past the Bou Inania Madrasa, the street's shops are more varied, traditionally having served rural visitors and local inhabitants. On the left, in the Ain Azliten area, the street passes by the Foundouk Achich (or Funduq 'Ashish), one of a number of such structures along the street. It eventually passes through the Chrabliyine (or "Shirabliyyin" for a more English transliteration) neighbourhood, where the street's shops were traditionally devoted to the sale of Moroccan slippers called cherbil or babouches. The Chrabliyine Mosque is also located here; its minaret, dating from the Marinid era, is considered one of the prettiest in the city and is prominently visible over the street. East of the Chrabliyine neighbourhood, the street descends steeply and becomes known as Ras Tiyyalin ("Crest of the Sifters") before it passes through the Ain Allou neighbourhood, where shops were traditionally specialized in leather goods and where it is rejoined by the Tala'a Seghira street.

=== The Souq al-Attarine and the Kissaria markets ===
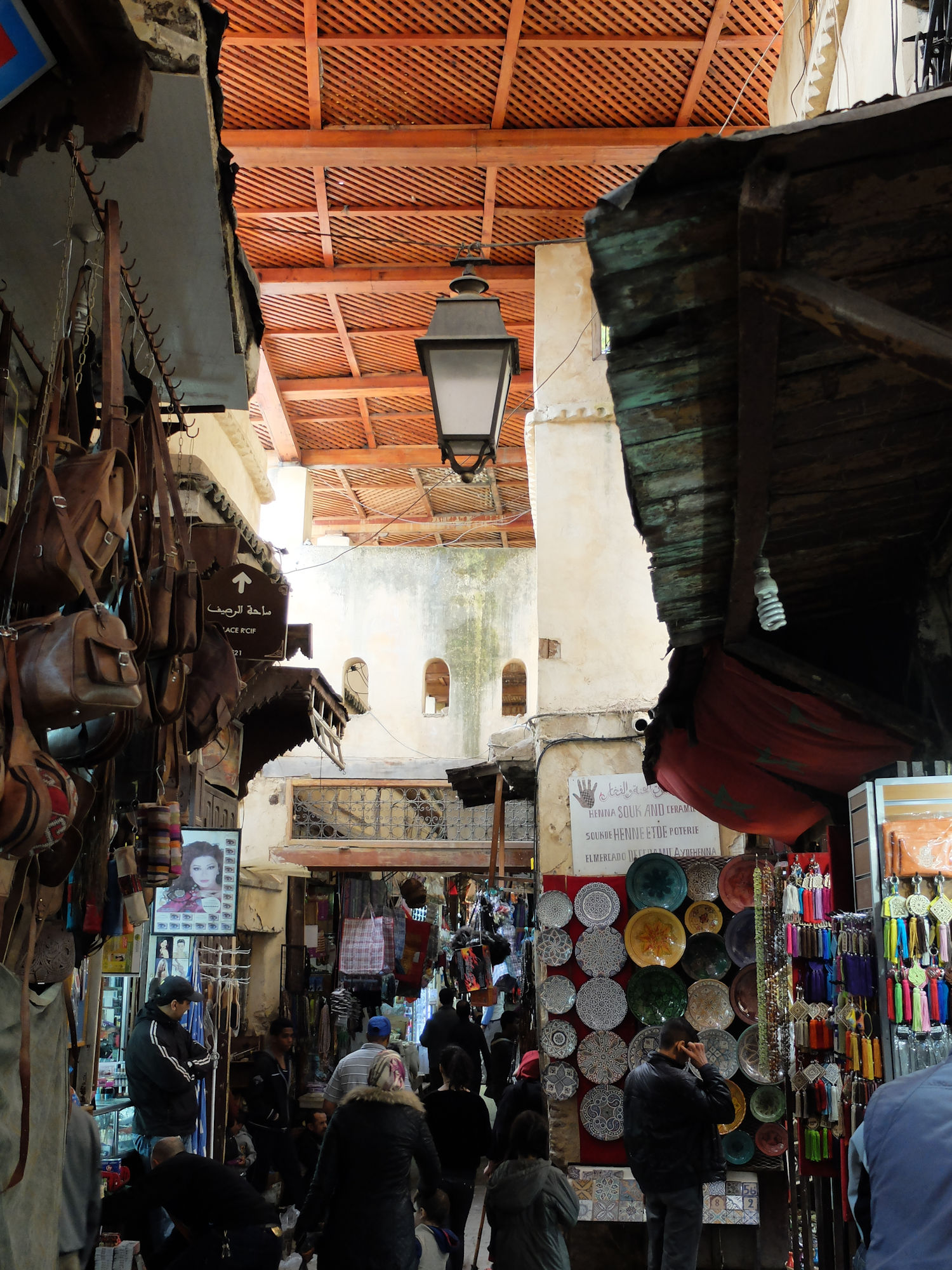
The western entrance to Souq al-Attarine (the Spice Market) on Tala'a Kebira.

After Ain Allou the street passes under a gate and enters the Souq al-'Attarine, the Spice Market. This is the main passage in a major network of commercial streets at the heart of the old city, which include the Kissaria (see below). The street here is roofed over and the district is guarded at either end by gates which, in earlier eras, could be locked by guards at night. As per the market's name, the shops here were historically specialized in the sale of spices and medicines, but nowadays they sell a variety of items. In the 16th century there were an estimated 150-170 shops here according to the chroniclers Leo Africanus and Marmol Carvajal.

On the north side of the street along this area are several other markets arranged around little squares; namely, the Souq at-Tellis, the Souq el-Haik, the Souk as-Selham, and the Souq al-Bali. Each of these markets was, traditionally, specialized in a particular type of clothing or garment, in addition to other textiles. On the south side of the street, near the western entrance of the Souq al-Attarine, is the entrance to the Souq al-Henna, the traditional Henna Market (which sold other beauty and hygiene products as well) in a small square with trees. Next to this square was the location of the Maristan of Sidi Frej, a former medieval hospital and hospice now occupied by a commercial foundouk. Slightly west of the square is another larger square known as Place Nejjarine, named after the carpenters (al-Najjariyyin) established on its northern side, also near Tala'a Kebira. The Nejjarine square is one of the most famous in the medina, and is the site of the Foundouk Nejjarine (now a museum) and one of the city's most famous historic fountains.

Slightly further east of the Souq al-Henna, and also on the south side of Tala'a Kebira, is the sanctuary (haram or horm) of Moulay Idris, an area around the Zawiya of Moulay Idris II which was historically off-limits to pack animals and non-Muslims. The entrance and border to this sanctuary is marked by a highly-decorated gateway with a wooden bar across it.

East of this sanctuary, and interconnected with the Souq al-Attarine, is the Kissariat al-Kifah, a close network of lanes and alleys which formed the central bazaar of the city and is still filled with hundreds of shops. The Kissaria (a name also used in other parts of the Islamic world and sometimes transliterated as qaysariyya) has been established here since the early Idrisid period of the city. However, its streets and houses were rebuilt at least once after the double devastation of a fire in 1324 and a flood in 1325, and then again in the 1920s following another fire, at which point many of the structures were rebuilt in concrete. The most recent renovations, in 2016 and 2017, replaced the street roofs with new wooden roofs, made various repairs and practical improvements, and added tile decoration along the lower walls.

Tala'a Kebira street finally ends, along with the Souq al-Attarine, in front of the entrance to the Madrasa al-Attarine. At this point the street forms a T-junction, with one road going north towards Bab Guissa, while to the south is the road passing alongside the al-Qarawiyyin Mosque and down towards the Bou Khrareb River.

== List of historic monuments along Tala'a Kebira ==
The following is a list of notable historic buildings located on Tala'a Kebira street or just off it, from west to east.

- Bab Bou Jeloud (just south of the street's entrance)
- Bou Inania Madrasa
- Dar al-Magana
- Chrabliyine Mosque
- Ain al-Kheil Mosque (a short distance north of the street)
- Souq al-Attarine (occupying the eastern section of the street itself)
- Maristan of Sidi Frej (on a square directly south of the street)
- Zawiya of Moulay Idris II (just south of the street and of the Maristan)
- Kissaria al-Kifah (south side of the street)
- Diwan Mosque (a short distance north of the street)
- Al-Attarine Madrasa
- Al-Qarawiyyin Mosque/University (located near the eastern end of the street)
