= Bab Guissa =

City gate in Fes, Morocco

- باب الكيسة
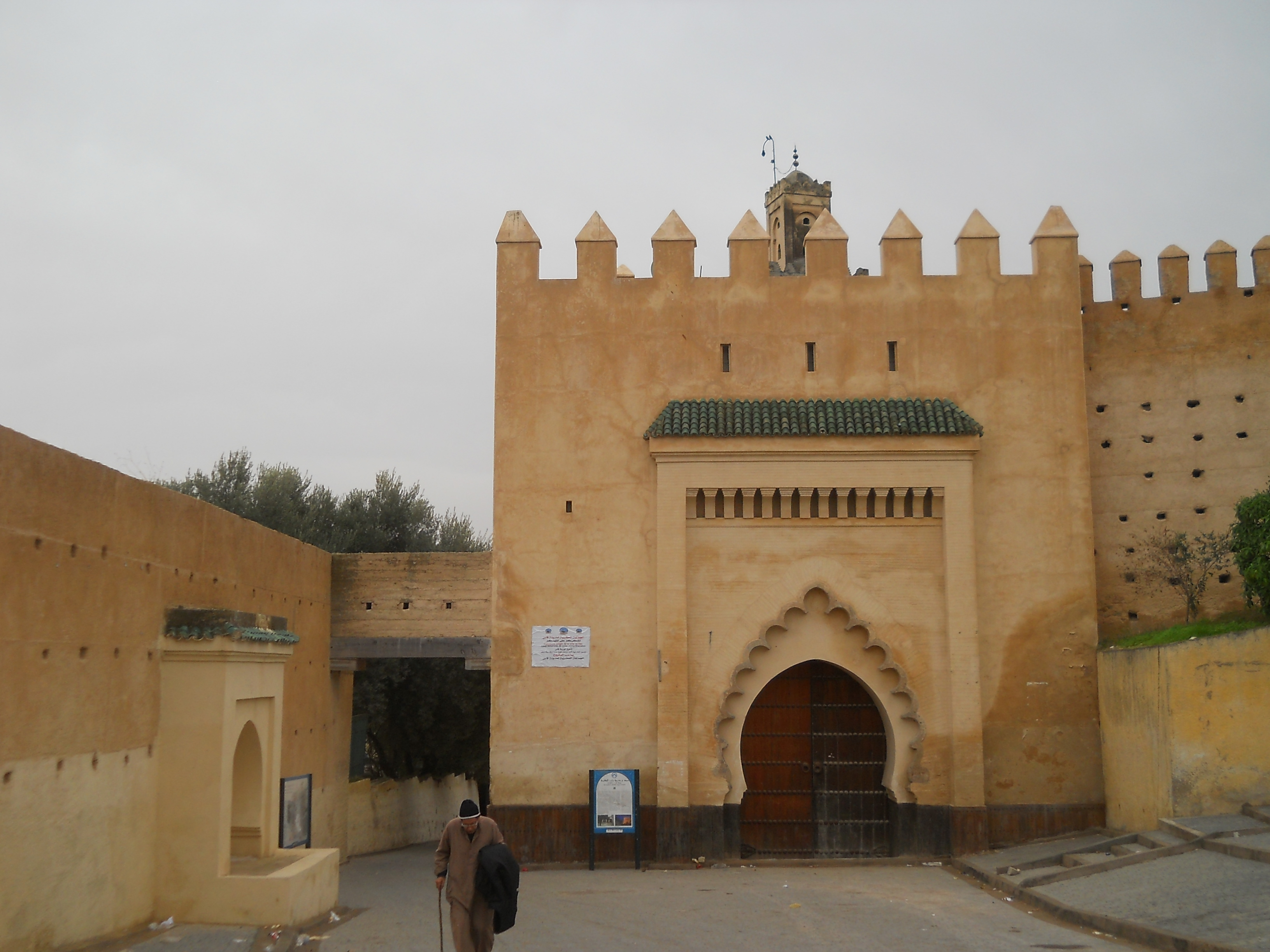
- Bab Guissa, outer facade.
- Interactive map of the Bab Guissa area

General information
- Type: city gate
- Architectural style: Almohad, Alaouite, Moorish, Moroccan
- Location: Fez, Morocco
- Coordinates: 34°04′7.83″N 4°58′32.64″W
- Completed: circa 1212
- Renovated: between 1258 and 1286, again after 1755

Bab Guissa or Bab Gisa (Arabic: باب الكيسة or باب عجيسة) is the main northwestern gate of Fes el Bali, the old walled city of Fes, Morocco.

== History ==
A gate by this name had existed in this part of the city walls since at least the 11th century. That gate was named after a Zenata emir, 'Ajisa Ibn Dunas (عجيسة بن دوناس), who dominated the early city of al-'Aliya (on the Qarawiyyin quarter of Fes), in rivalry with his brother, el-Fetouh, who dominated the city of Madinat Fas (now the Andalous quarter) on the opposite shore of the river and who probably gave his name to another gate, Bab Ftouh. The two brothers were in power between 1059 and 1061 and both were likely responsible for building these gates, meaning Bab Guissa must have been built during these years. Soon after, the two cities were definitively joined into a single city with a single set of walls by the Almoravids, who conquered the city in 1069. These walls were destroyed in 1145 by the Almohad conqueror Abd al-Mu'min and then rebuilt by one of his successors, Muhammad al-Nasir, in 1212. The current gate is believed to date essentially from Muhammad al-Nasir's construction, making it one of the oldest preserved gates in the city along with Bab Mahrouk (also from the same period). Nonetheless, after the Almohads, the gate was restored by the Marinid sultan Abu Yusuf Ya'qub in the 13th century and was repaired or rebuilt in the 18th century after the destruction of the 1755 earthquake.

== Description ==
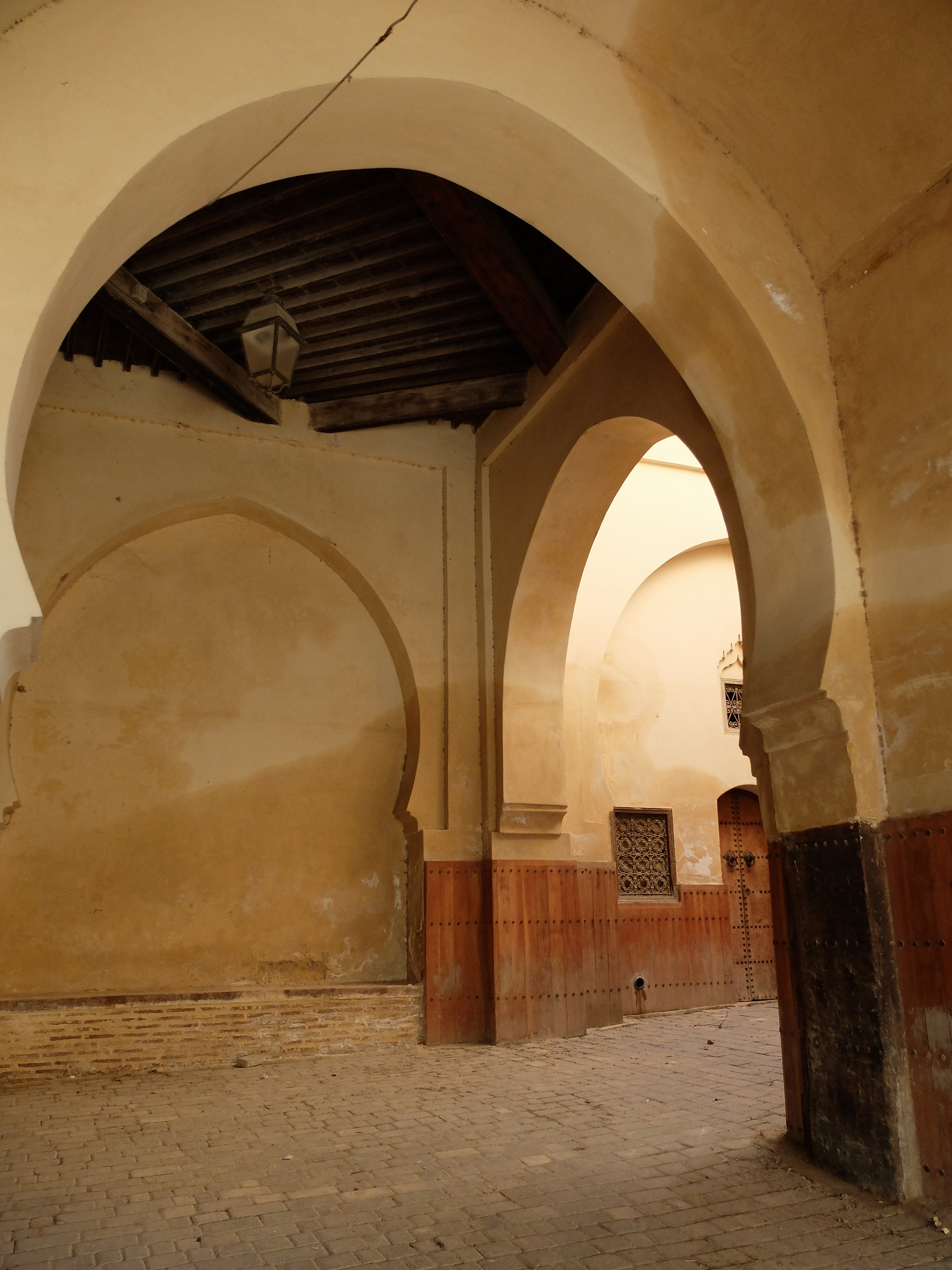
The bent passage inside the gate.

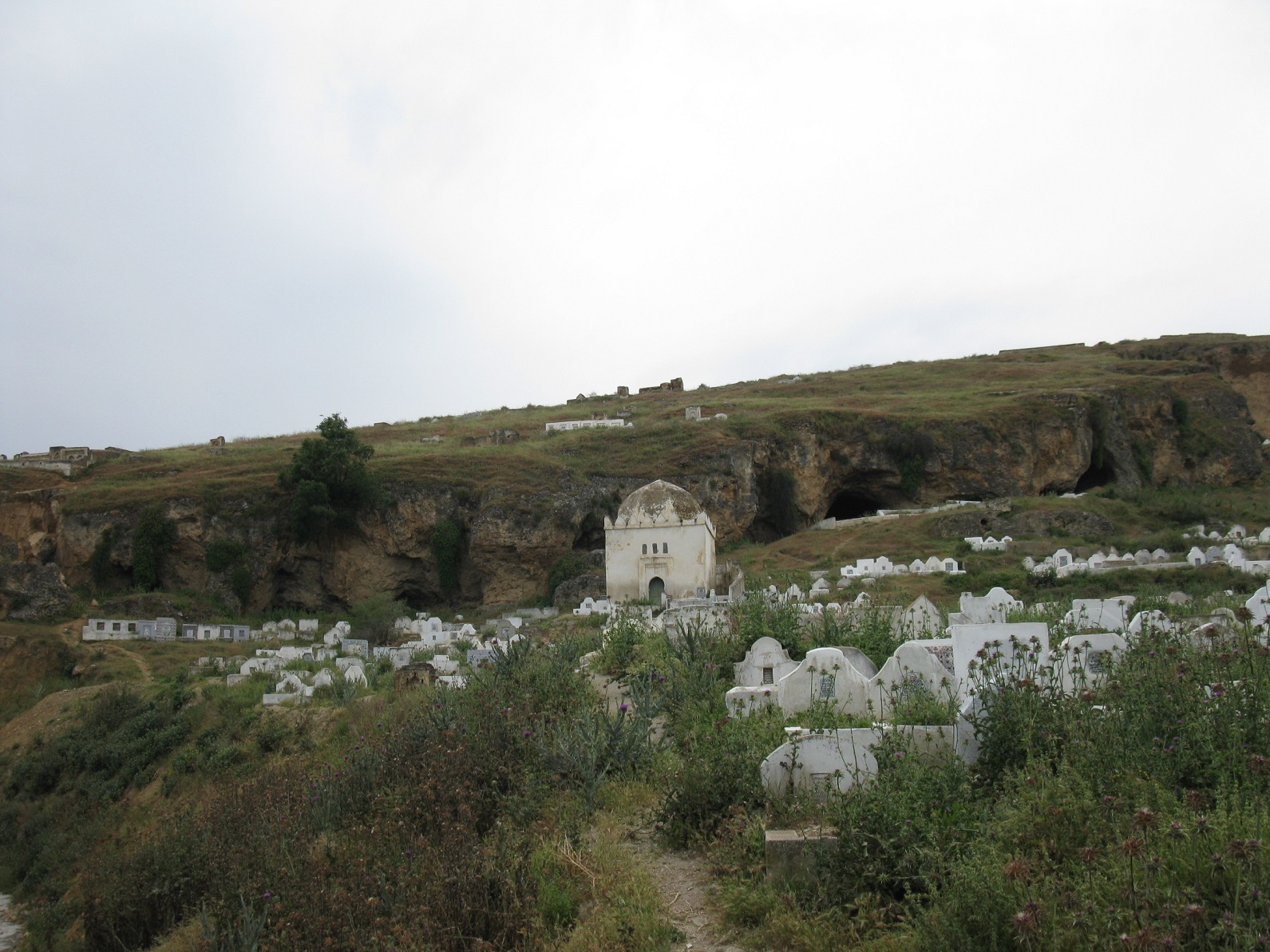
A part of the Bab Guissa Cemetery, stretching uphill outside the city walls.

The original monumental gate, still standing, has a bent entrance; its internal passage turns 90 degrees as it enters the city. An opening has since been created besides the gate to allow more direct passage, most likely in the early 20th century. The modest decoration on the original gate, made of stucco or plaster and likely dating from restorations, consists blind arches along the inner passage and the outline of a blind polylobed arch on the outer facade inside a rectangular, slightly canopied, frame.

The area of Bab Guissa was historically known for a bird market as well as for the public performances of popular storytellers. Just inside the gate is the Bab Guissa Mosque and its adjoining madrasa, one of the important historic religious institutions of the city. Like with the other main gates of the old city (Bab Ftouh and Bab Mahrouk), a large cemetery stretches outside the city walls near the gate, known as the Bab Guissa Cemetery. Though not quite as extensive as the other two, the cemetery is also overlooked by the Marinid Tombs, a ruined Marinid royal necropolis from the 14th century.
