= Bab Bou Jeloud =

City gate in Fez, Morocco

- باب بوجلود
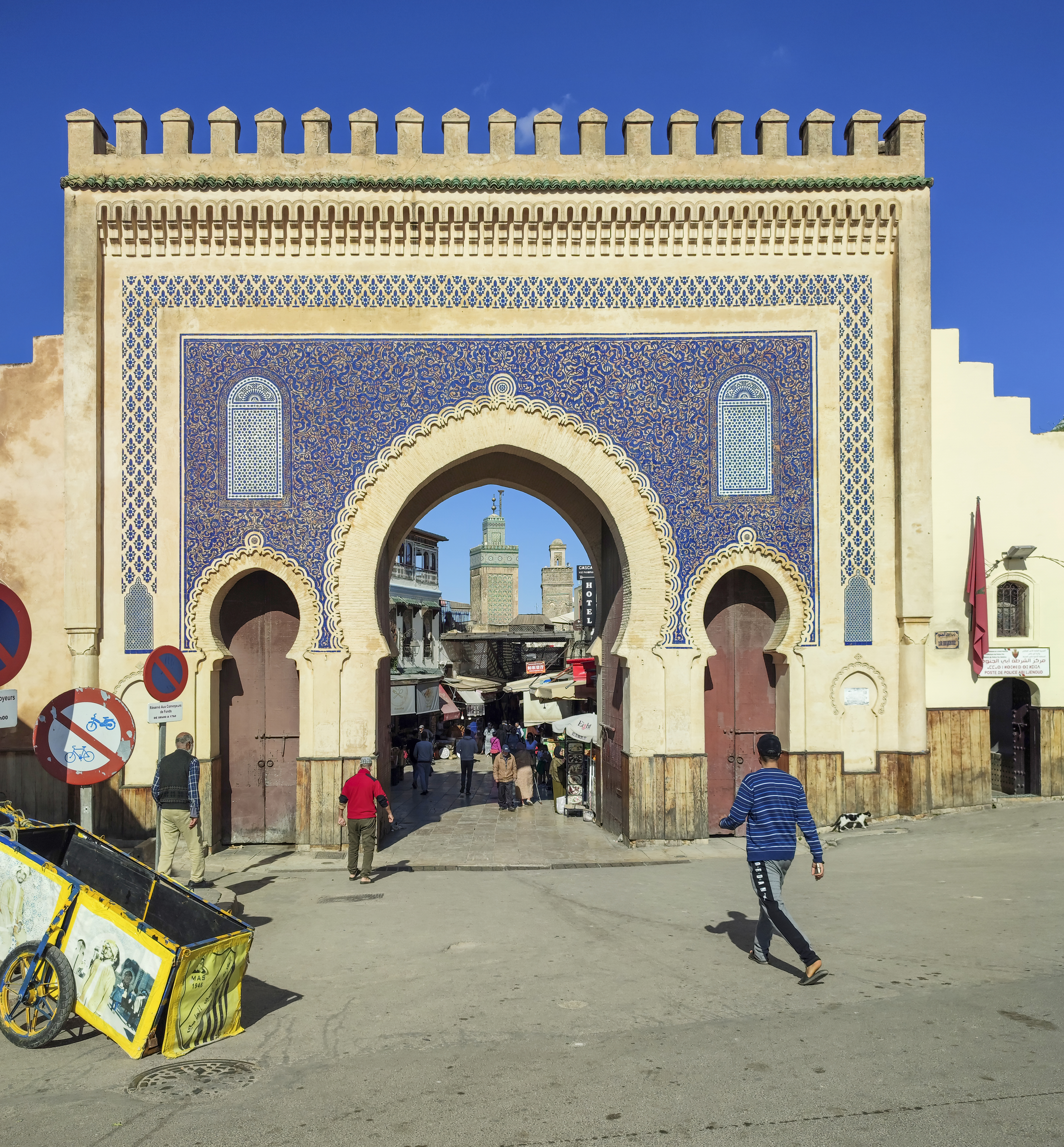
- Outer (western) façade of the gate
- Interactive map of the Bab Bou Jeloud area
- Alternative names: Bab Abi al-Jounoud

General information
- Type: City gate
- Architectural style: Mauresque style, Moorish, Moroccan
- Location: Fez, Morocco
- Coordinates: 34°3′42″N 4°59′2″W
- Completed: 1913 (current structure)

Bab Bou Jeloud (also spelled Bab Boujeloud or Bab Boujloud) is an ornate city gate in Fes el Bali, the old city of Fez, Morocco. The current gate was built by the French colonial administration in 1913 to serve as the grand entrance to the old city.

== Historical background ==
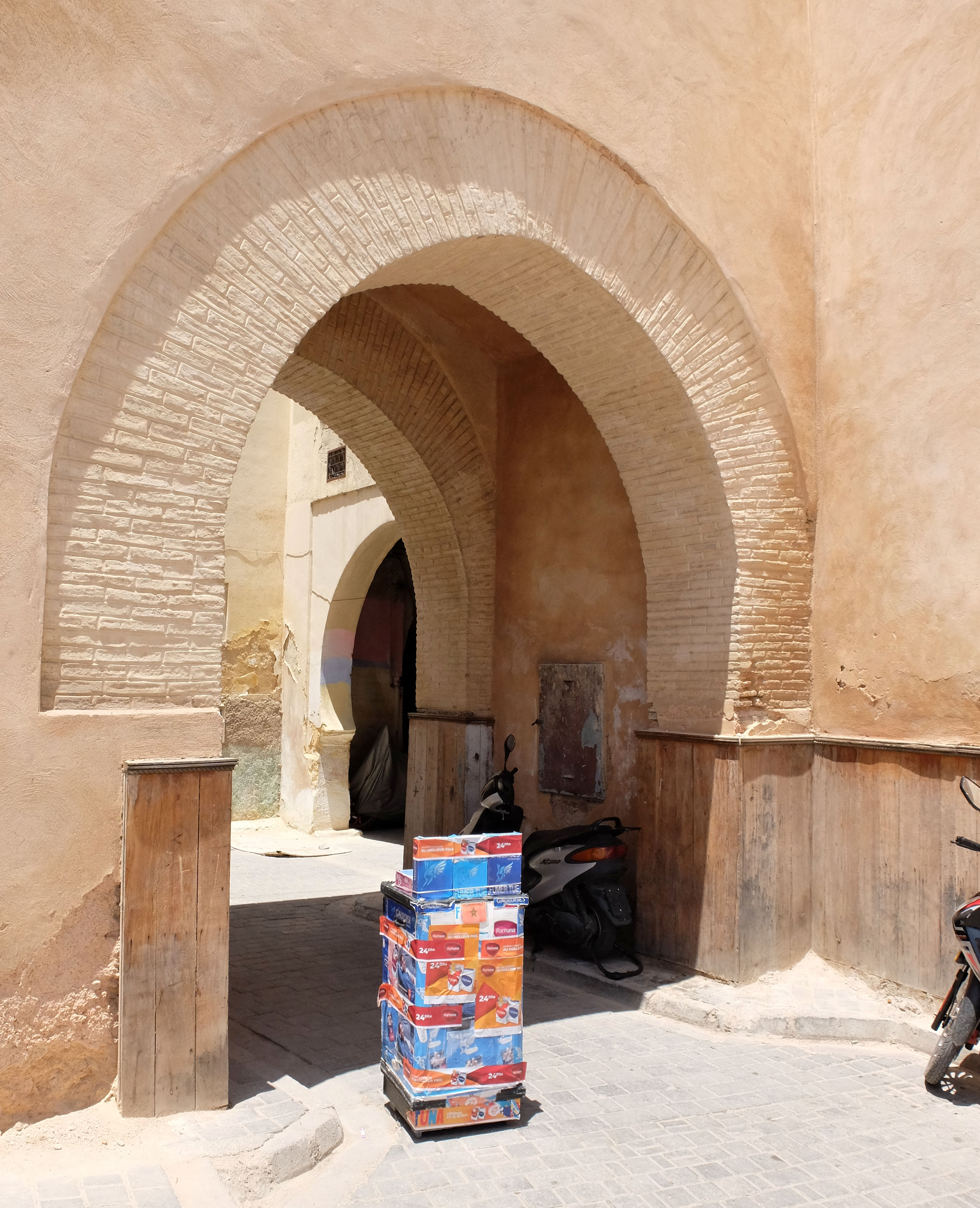
The original Bab Bou Jeloud, a more modest structure with a bent entrance, still extant next to the monumental gate of 1913

The name Bou Jeloud dates from well before the existence of the current gate. By one account, the name is a vernacular corruption of the expression Abu al-Junud ("Father of the troops"), referring to a parade ground or military square, in this case the large square known as Place Bou Jeloud (now also called Place el-Baghdadi) just west of the gate. It is also located near the site of what used to be one of the main citadels of Fes el-Bali, the Kasbah Bou Jeloud, as well as near the Kasbah en-Nouar.

The old Bab Bou Jeloud gate was a simple, modest gate that may have dated essentially from the 12th century. It gave access directly to the start of Tala'a Kebira, the main souq street that crosses the medina and leads to the Qarawiyyin mosque and university at the heart of the city. The gate's passage was set at an angle perpendicular to Tala'a Kebira and parallel to the city wall, meaning that one entered sideways onto Tala'a Kebira. This type of configuration was fairly common in old Moroccan city gates, as it made it easier to defend and to control access. This original gate is still visible to the left of the current monumental gate (when facing it from the outside), but it is closed off today.

After the advent of gunpowder and heavy artillery, the fortifications of old cities like Fez were no longer particularly useful as serious military defenses (though they were still effective at keeping out rural tribes who were poorly armed), and city gates took on a mostly decorative role. Following the establishment of the French Protectorate over Morocco in 1912, the French took over the administration of the city and appear to have wanted a grander entrance to the old city. The chief of municipal services, Captain Mellier, soon laid out plans in December 1912 to open a new entrance in the city walls. The city administration purchased and demolished a stables and three shops at the chosen site; a process which required careful negotiations as the shops were dedicated to the revenues of a charitable fund (a waqf). After this, construction took place in 1913.

The new gate was designed to emulate Moroccan architecture and today it is an iconic sight of the historic medina of Fez. It still marks the main western entrance to the medina and the limit beyond which car traffic generally cannot pass into the historic city.

== Description ==
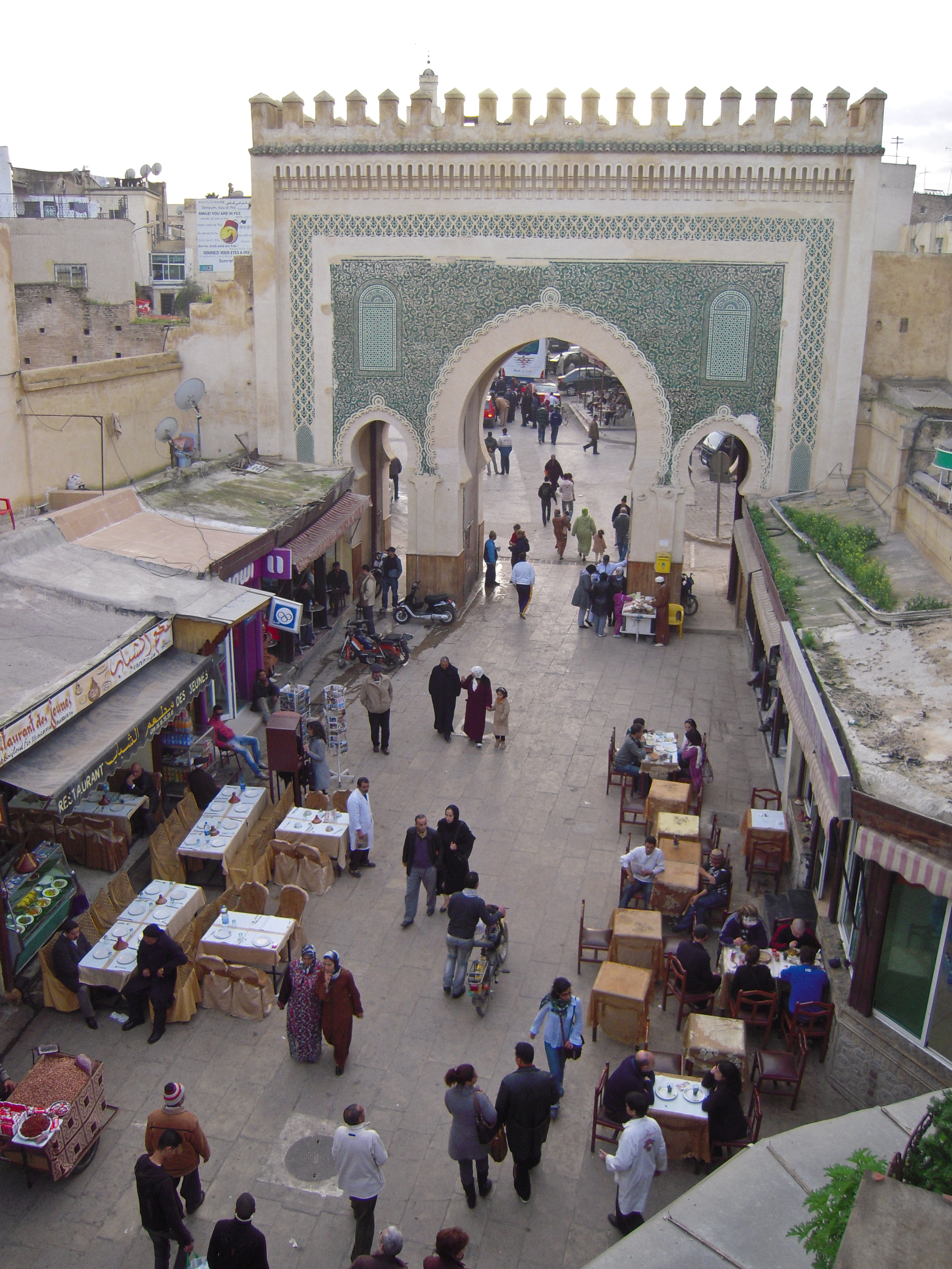
The inner (eastern) side of the gate

The structure is a triple-arched gate that makes use of Moorish architectural forms, with pointed horseshoe arches and a crenelated top. Both the inner and outer facades are covered in polychrome tiles featuring arabesques and Moroccan geometric motifs, with the outer facade predominantly blue and the interior facade predominantly green-ish. Strangely, the actual doors of the gate seem to close and lock from the outside; perhaps an indication that the French administration saw it partly as a means of controlling the movement of the inhabitants inside the medina.

Beyond the gate, a small square ringed by shops and restaurants today gives access to both Tala'a Kebira and Tala'a Seghira, the main streets of the city leading towards the Qarawiyyin and the heart of the medina.

The silhouettes of the minarets visible through the main arch when standing outside the gate are those of the Bou Inania Madrasa and the more recent Sidi Lazzaz Mosque.

== See also ==
- Gates of Fez
- Bou Jeloud Mosque
