= Kasbah An-Nouar =

Coordinates: 34°03′45.1″N 4°59′6.4″W

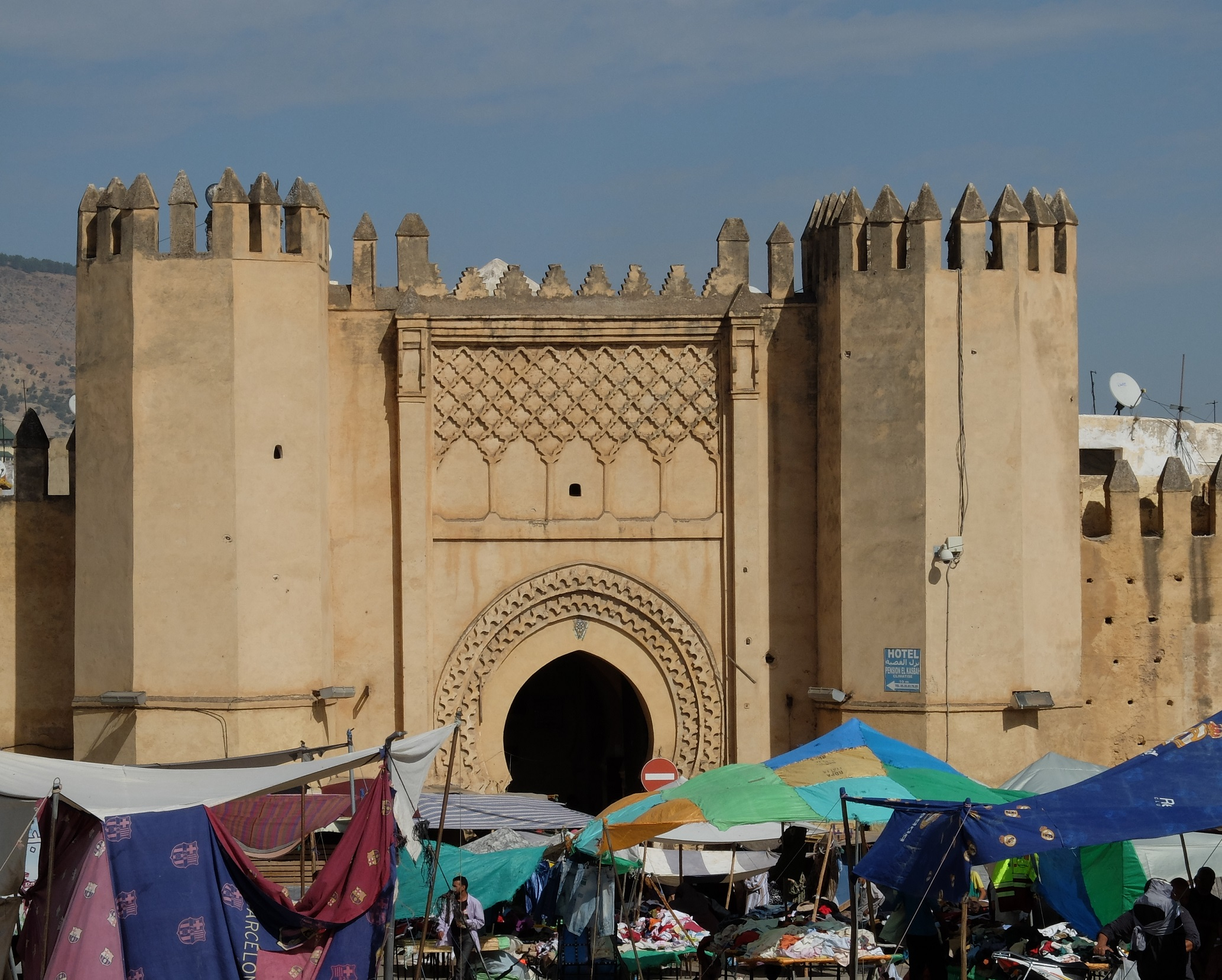
Bab Chorfa, the gate and entrance of the kasbah from Place Bou Jeloud. There is a market in front of the gate on most days.

The Kasbah An-Nouar or Kasbah Filali is a walled district and former military enclosure in the old medina of Fez, Morocco. Its name means "citadel of the flowers", but it is sometimes also referred to as Kasbah Filala and Kasbah Chorfa. It is one of several fortified military enclosures or kasbahs that were built around the old city of Fez across different periods.

== History ==
The foundation of the kasbah reportedly dates to the Almohad period when Muhmmad al-Nasir (12th century) rebuilt the fortifications of Fez. It is likely that it took its present form, however, during the 'Alawi period, when it acquired its association with the Filala (settlers from the Tafilalt region).

=== Medieval period (12th century to 16th century) ===
The Almohads under Abd al-Mu'min conquered Fez in 1145 after a difficult siege in which the inhabitants had put up fierce resistance. In retaliation for this opposition and to prevent future resistance, Abd al-Mu'min ordered all the walls and fortifications of Fez to be demolished. Eventually, however, given the city's central economic importance and its role as a military base for northern Morocco, the fourth Almohad caliph, Muhammad al-Nasir (1199–1213), built a new circuit of city walls as well as two citadels or kasbahs in the west of the city. The decision to fortify the city at this time may also have been due to the Almohads' serious defeat at the Battle of Las Navas de Tolosa in 1212, which rendered the empire more vulnerable.

One of these new kasbahs was the Kasbah An-Nouar, erected in an area adjacent to the western gate of Bab Mahrouk (which was also built at this time). The other, Kasbah Bou Jeloud, was built nearby to the south on the site of the former Almoravid citadel near Bab Bou Jeloud. The Kasbah Bou Jeloud is no longer fortified today but was of notable importance for being the residence of the governor of Fez at various periods (including at the beginning of the 20th century).

The defensive system of Fez continued to evolve, however. The Marinids, who succeeded the Almohads in the 13th century and made Fez their capital and residence, found the existing military citadels insufficient for their own purposes. Instead, they built the new palace-city of Fes el-Jdid to the west, outside the old city (Fes el-Bali), with its own walls and bastions. When Morocco was taken over by the Saadian dynasty (16th-17th centuries) the capital was moved to Marrakesh, while the Saadians built new fortresses (among them Borj Nord) to keep Fez under control.

=== 'Alawi period (17th century to present) ===
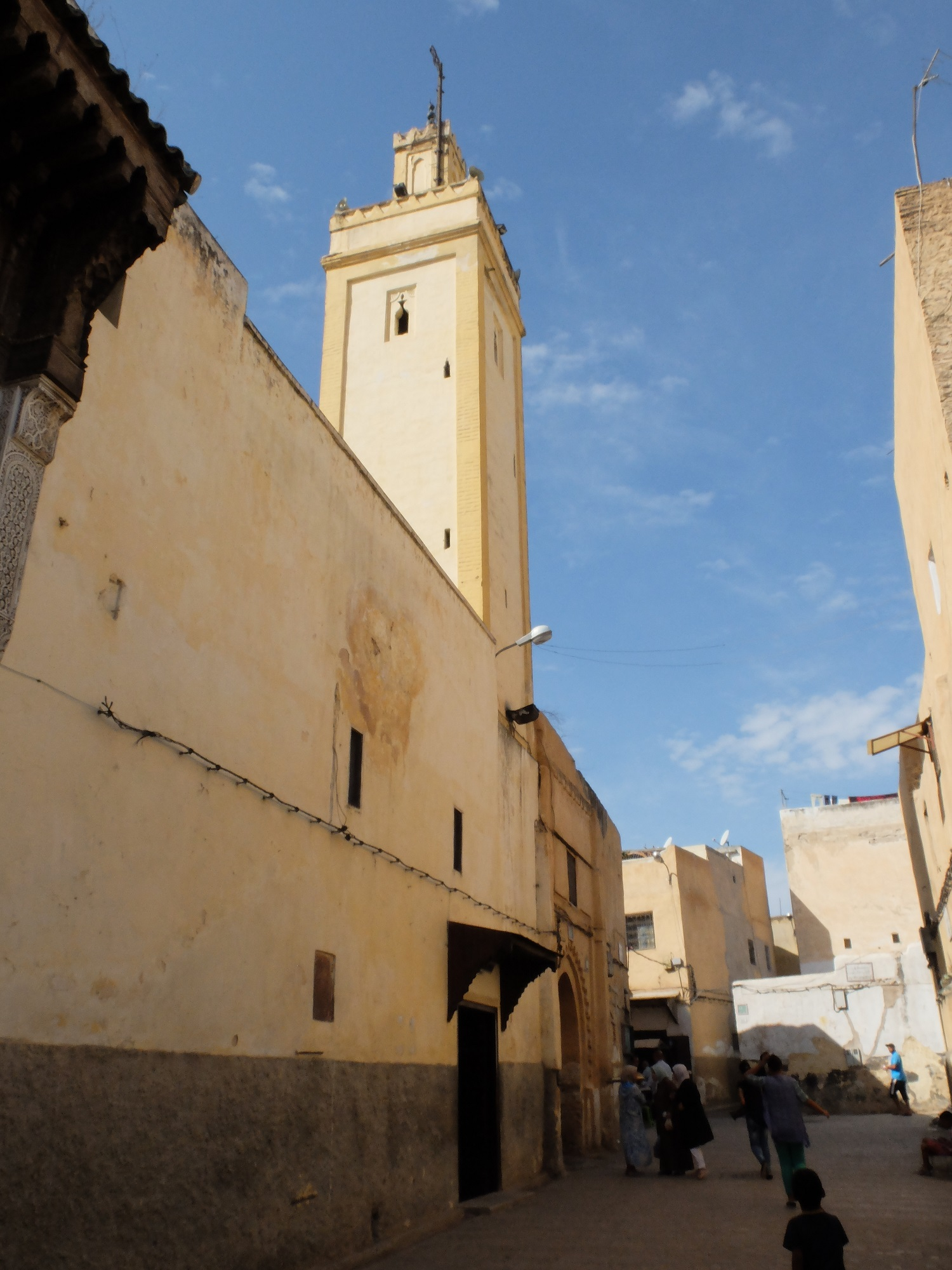
The mosque of the kasbah

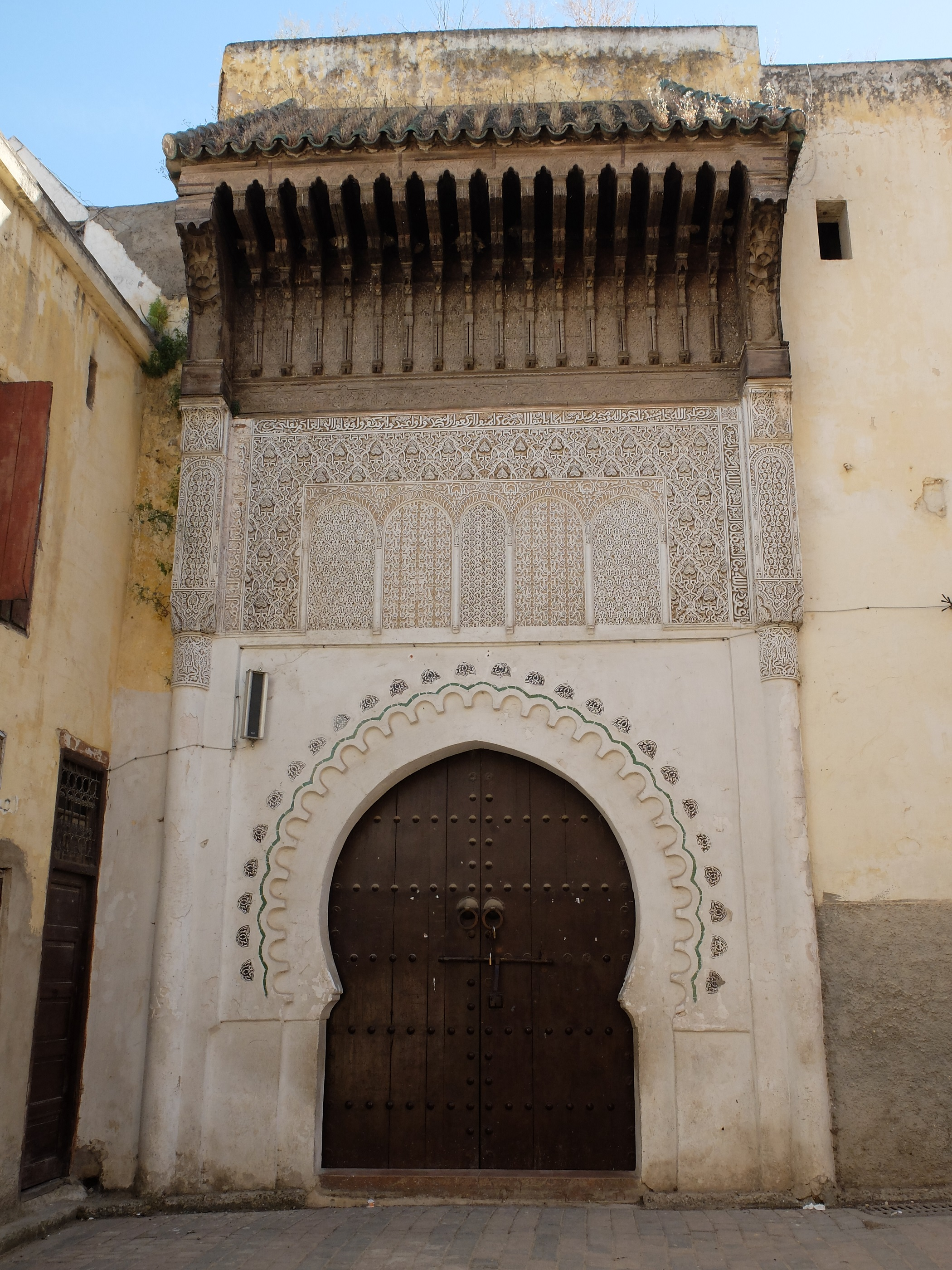
One of the mosque's entrances

The first 'Alawi sultan, Moulay Rachid (1664–1672), once again turned Fez into the capital of Morocco. The 'Alawi sharifs (descendants of the Prophet Muhammad) had been based in the eastern oasis region of Tafilalt before they conquered the country, and as a result Moulay Rachid was followed and accompanied by many people from that region as he came to power. The Kasbah en-Nouar was given over to settlers from the Tafilalt and thus acquired the name Kasbah Filala (meaning "Citadel of the people from Tafilalt"; Filala being the corresponding demonym). It was given a certain special status and autonomy from the rest of the old city. Moulay Rachid also built the nearby Kasbah Cherarda to house guich tribes, showing the extent to which sultans often built new districts on the edge of Fez to suite the needs of their regime.

The Kasbah An-Nouar's walls and its Friday mosque were restored under the later 'Alawi sultan Moulay Slimane (1792–1822). The kasbah's main gate, Bab Chorfa, also dates from the 'Alawi period in its current form.

==== Community and self-governance in the 'Alawi period ====
Historically, since the 'Alawi period, the community inside the kasbah was self-governed (instead of governed by officials of the central government). It elected its own council of 12 elders who in turn designated a chief, a secretary and a treasurer. These leaders were in charge of managing the neighbourhood's services and infrastructure, which could be maintained thanks to specially reserved revenues under waqf (trust) agreements. These included, for example, the revenues of various shops and rented housing.

This self-governance reflects the fact that, up until at least the 20th century, the kasbah was inhabited strictly by families of Filali (Tafilalt) origin, and this system likely reflected practices of local governance that existed in the Tafilalt. Among them were also many sharifian families of the extended royal 'Alawi family (also of Filali origin, as mentioned), which may have further motivated the district's special status. (This may also be the reason for the name of its gate, Bab Chorfa; shurafa being the plural of Arabic sharif.) Entry to the kasbah was forbidden to non-Muslims, and even other Muslims were not welcome unless they belonged to one of the local Filali families. In his 1982 book on Fez, author Attilio Gaudio stated that the Kasbah was still closed to non-Muslims.

== Description ==
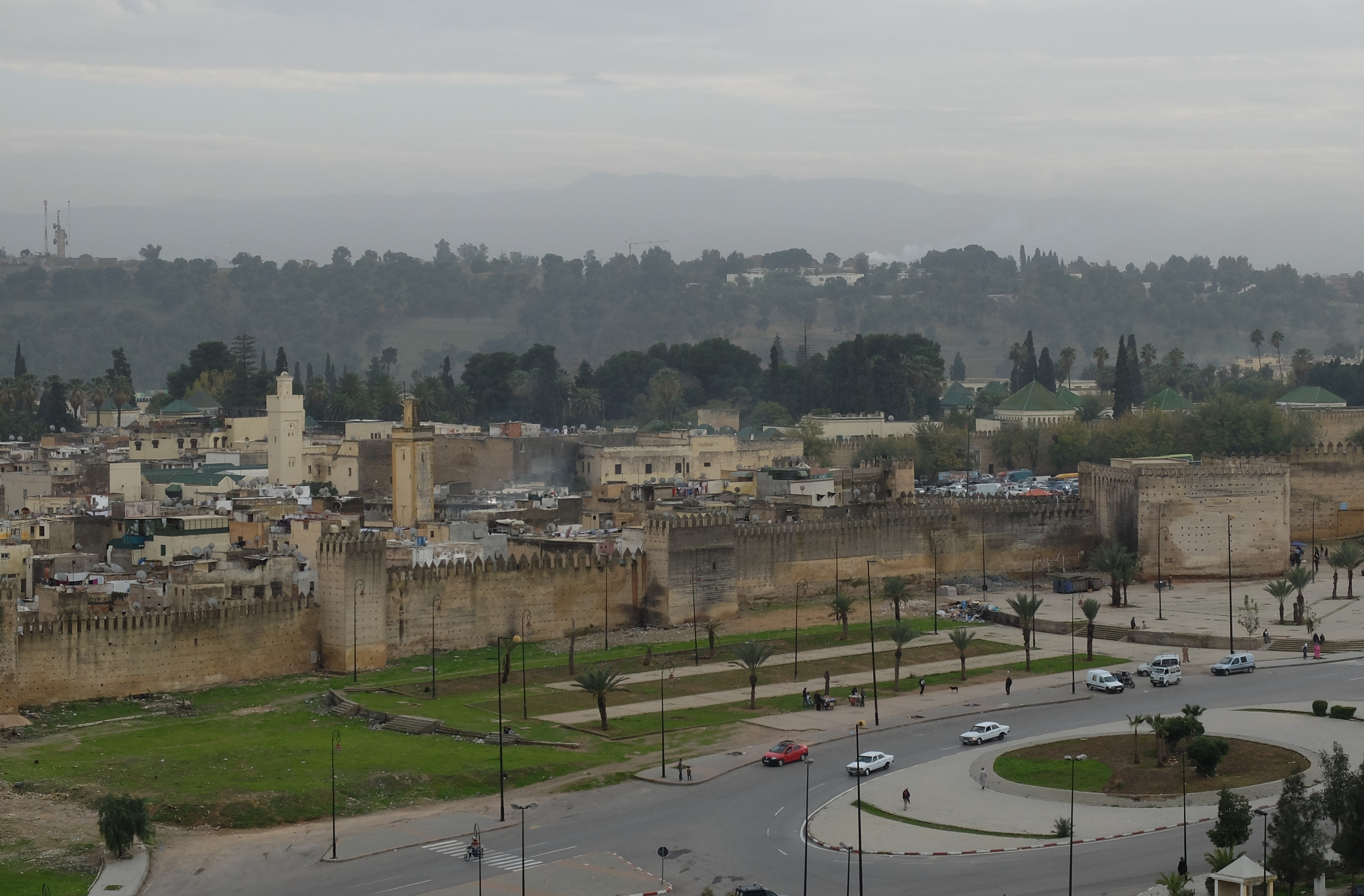
View of the kasbah from outside the walls, to the north. The second minaret from the left belongs to the mosque of the kasbah. The rectangular bastion on the far right is Bab Mahrouk, a city gate adjacent to the kasbah.

The Kasbah (citadel) is located at the western or north-western tip of Fes el-Bali, between Bab Bou Jeloud (the main western entrance to the old medina) and Bab Mahrouk. It is enclosed by tall fortified walls and closed off from the rest of the medina: the main city walls of Fes el-Bali run along its northwestern side, while another wall curtails it on its eastern and southern sides.

Its only entry point is Bab Chorfa, a monumental gate that opens from Place Bou Jeloud (Bou Jeloud Square; also known as Place Pacha el-Baghdadi or Place Baghdadi). The gate is flanked by two strong octagonal towers and is decorated with carved patterns. Inside, the gate has a bent passage (i.e. it turns at straight angle multiple times) and is composed of several sequential chambers. Inside the towers are a dozen chambers which historically could be rented out to contribute to the revenues of the community.

Inside the walls, the kasbah today is a residential district packed with houses and winding alleys, much like the rest of the medina. Just north of the entrance, near the beginning of the kasbah's main street, is a Friday mosque, flanked by a small public square (Ous'at Bab el-Jama'). Its minaret is fairly prominent and easily visible from outside the kasbah, and its main portal off the square. The date and origin of the mosque is uncertain, but likely coincides with the kasbah's foundation, which may make it an Almohad foundation as well, but most likely later restored or rebuilt under the 'Alawis.

Outside the kasbah, in front of Bab Chorfa, is a local but extensive open-air market that has taken place here for generations.

== See also ==
- Lists of mosques
- List of mosques in Africa
- List of mosques in Morocco
