= Bab Guissa Mosque =

Mosque in Fez, Morocco

- جامع باب الكيسة
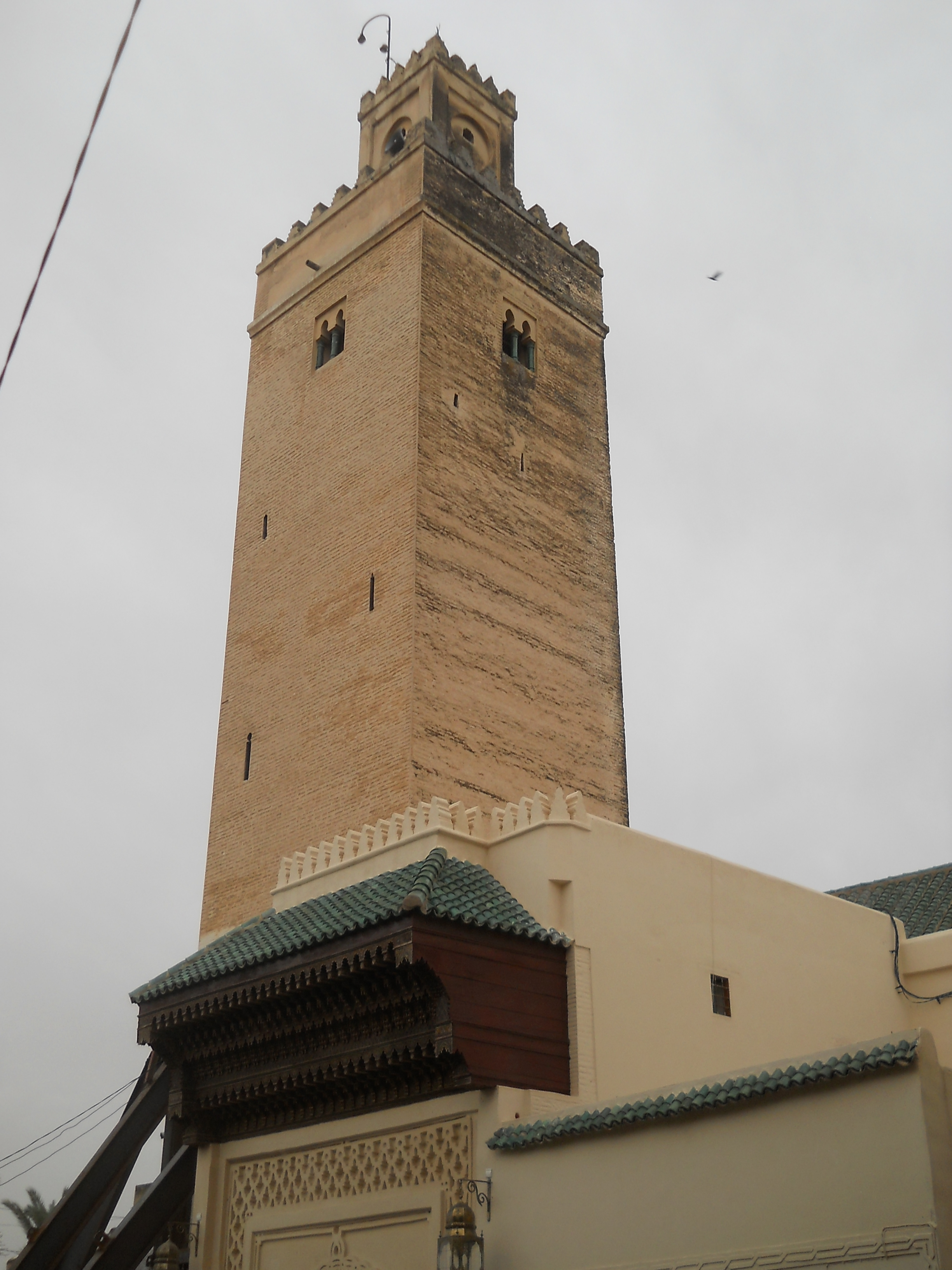

Religion
- Affiliation: Sunni Islam
- Status: active

Location
- Location: Fez, Morocco
- Interactive map of Bab Guissa Mosque
- Coordinates: 34°04′6.5″N 4°58′33″W

Architecture
- Type: Mosque
- Style: Moorish, Moroccan (Alawi)
- Founder: Abu al-Hasan
- Completed: 14th century 18th century (restored and expanded)
- Minaret: 1

The Bab Guissa Mosque (Arabic: جامع باب الكيسة, romanized: Jama' Bab (al-)Gisa) is a medieval mosque in northern Fes el-Bali, the old city of Fez, Morocco. It is located next to the city gate of the same name, and also features an adjoining madrasa.

== History ==
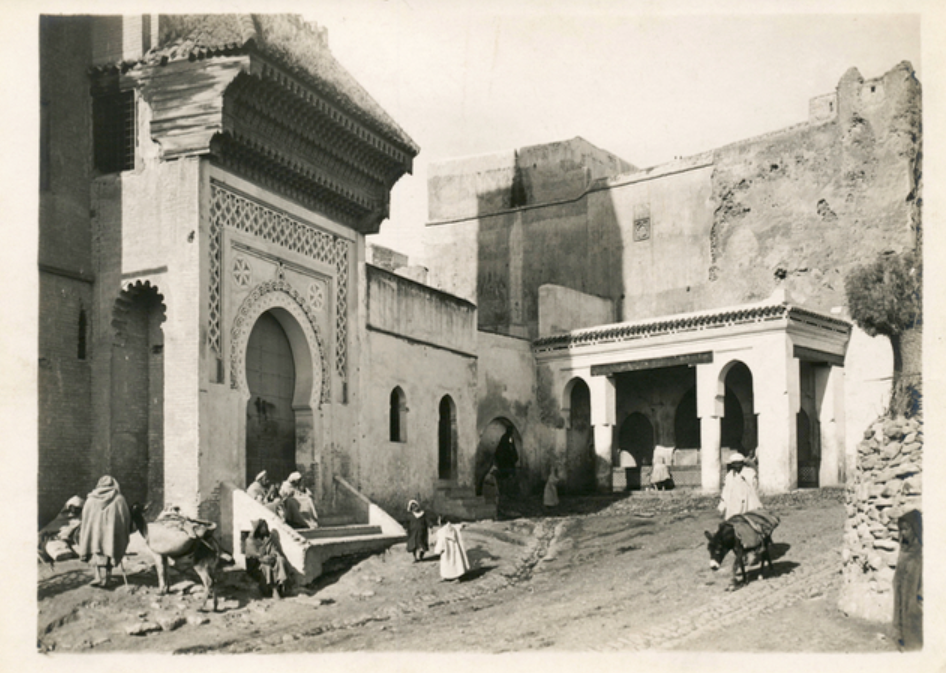
The entrance (left) and gallery fountains (right) of the Bab Guissa Mosque, circa 1920.

Based on an inscription on one of its marble columns, the mosque is thought to originate from the 14th century, during the reign of the Marinid sultan Abu al-Hasan (r. 1331–1351). In the late 18th century, the Alawi sultan Mohammed ibn Abdallah (r. 1757–1790) built an adjoining madrasa while also restoring and expanding the mosque itself. The mosque was reportedly heavily restored and modified at the end of the 19th century as well.

The mosque is named after the nearby Bab Guissa, a city gate which was in turn named after the 11th-century Zenata prince al-Guissa ibn Dounas (عجيسة بن دوناس) who built the original gate by this name.

== Description ==
=== Mosque ===
The mosque occupies a space of about 1,440 square metres (15,500 sq ft) and is located just inside the northern city gate called Bab Guissa. This is a relatively elevated position compared to the rest of Fes el-Bali, and as a result the mosque's minaret is prominent on the northern skyline of the historic city. The minaret is plain and mostly undecorated. On the mosque's eastern side, next to the base of the minaret, is the mosque's main entrance. The gateway is decorated with typical Moroccan motifs including interlacing semi-circles around the doorway's arch and a larger square frame with a band of darj-w-ktaf or sebka (a pattern with shapes similar to palmettes or fleur-de-lys). Above the door is a carved and painted wooden canopy, also characteristic of traditional Moroccan architecture. Next to this entrance, and adjoining the city wall, is a small outdoor gallery with wall fountains for ablutions (ritual washing before prayer), decorated with mosaic tiles (zellij) in geometric patterns as well as tiles painted with arabesques and Arabic calligraphy.

The interior of the mosque is dominated by a relatively large courtyard or sahn, surrounded by galleries on three sides and by the main prayer hall on its southeastern side, all marked by large, slightly pointed horseshoe arches which are typical of medieval Moroccan mosques. The courtyard has a typical central fountain, but is also shaded by several fig trees, a much less typical feature. The main prayer hall is short and only two rows deep. The wall around the mihrab (i.e. a niche on the qibla wall indicating the direction of prayer) is richly decorated with carved stucco and, in its top portion, a row of stained glass windows with grilles of geometric patterns.

=== Funerary mosque annex ===
Behind the prayer hall (to the south or southeast) and attached but secluded from the rest of the mosque is an interior prayer space (of similar size to the main prayer hall) used only for funerary rites and for prayers over the bodies of the deceased before burial. This type of annex to a mosque, called a Jama al-Gna'iz ("Funeral Mosque" or Mosque of the Dead) is not common to all mosques in the Islamic world, but similar annexes are attached to the Qarawiyyin Mosque and the Chrabliyine Mosque in Fes. It is designed to be separate from the main mosque so as to maintain the purity of the latter as a regular prayer space (which by religious principle must not be soiled by unclean things, which would include dead bodies). This part of the mosque is accessed by another monumental portal on the south side of the complex, decorated with a radiating or semi-circular geometric pattern reminiscent of Almohad and Marinid gates. Since the Bab Guissa cemetery is located just outside the nearby city gate, it is likely that the mosque was well-situated to offer this type of service.

=== Madrasa ===
Adjacent to the mosque is the 18th-century madrasa (for religious studies) built by sultan Mohammed ibn Abdallah (r. 1757–1790). It is accessed through a door in the mosque's northern wall, but the building is located on the mosque's western or southwestern side. It is roughly the same length as the mosque but only half as wide. It consists of a two-story gallery around a long courtyard of 22 by 4.8 metres (72 by 16 ft) with a central fountain. Aside from the floor of the courtyard, which is paved with simple zellij mosaic tiles, this madrasa is essentially undecorated (in contrast with more famous madrasas in the city like the much older (14th century) Bou Inania Madrasa or the slightly more contemporary (17th century) Cherratine Madrasa). Today, the courtyard is also covered with modern light roof to keep out the rain. The galleries give access to the sleeping cells of the students.

Seminars were conducted in the madrasa, and the mosque itself also hosted two teaching chairs (i.e. professors). At the beginning of the 20th century the madrasa housed 40-60 students, mostly from the nearby mountain regions of Morocco. It is still in use today.

== See also ==
- List of mosques in Morocco
