= Place Bou Jeloud =

Public square in Fes, Morocco

Coordinates: 34°03′40″N 4°59′10″W

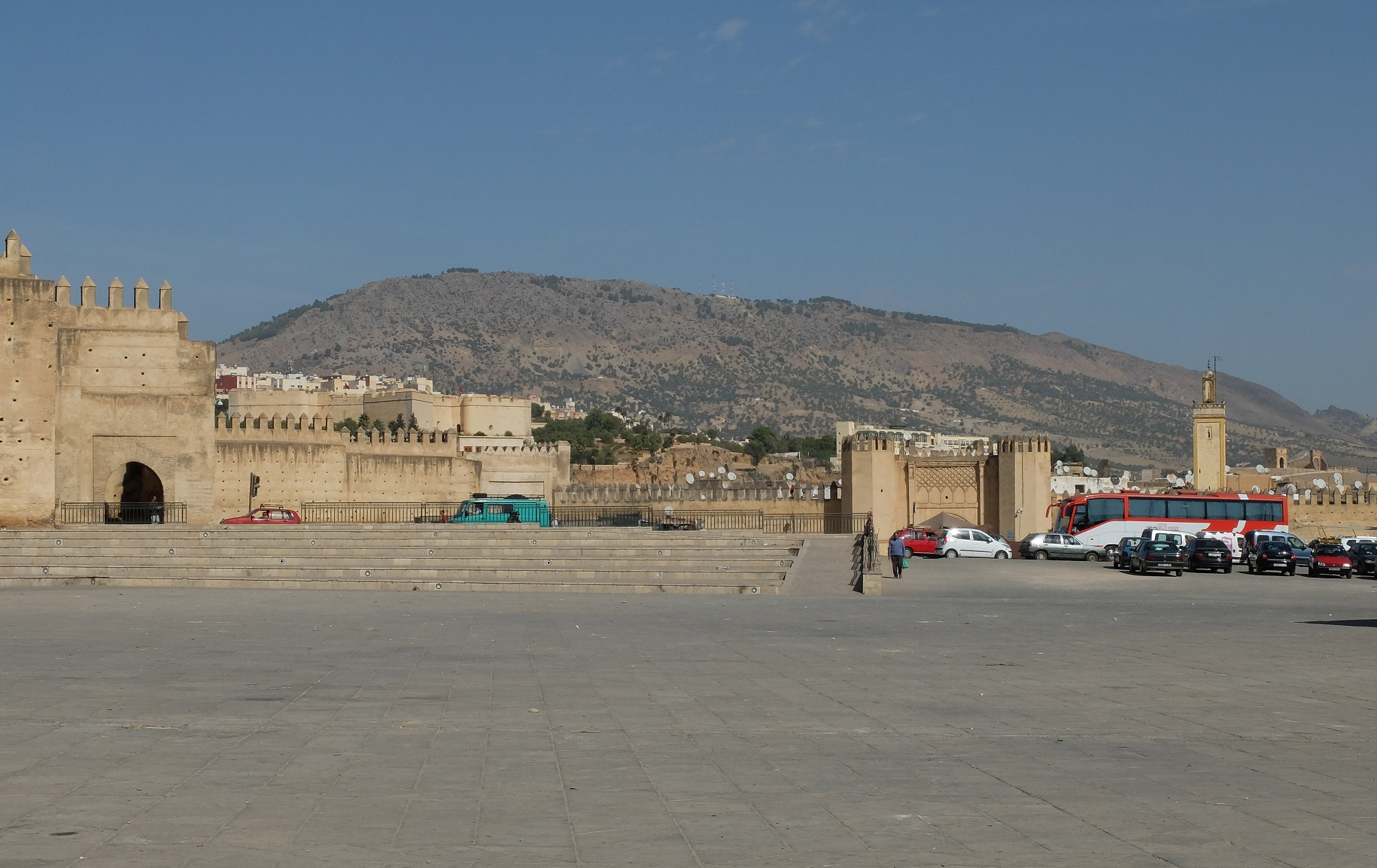
Bou Jeloud Square, looking north towards Kasbah an-Nouar.

Place Bou Jeloud (also spelled Boujloud or Bu Jeloud), also known as Place Pacha el-Baghdadi, is a large public square in Fes, Morocco, located west of Bab Bou Jeloud gate.

== Name ==
Bou Jeloud, the square's historical name, is also associated with the former kasbah (citadel) on its southern side and to the famous city gate to its east today. The name "Bou Jeloud" (or Bou Jloud) is reportedly a vernacular corruption of the expression Abu al-Junud ("father of the troops"), referring to a military parade ground.

Today the square is also named after Pasha Si Mohammed Ben Bouchta El Baghdadi, the officer who was placed in charge of Fes during the first 20 years of the French Protectorate between 1912 and his death in 1932.

== Historical background ==
The square likely dates from the Almohad period (early 13th century) when most of the surrounding fortifications were constructed by Muhammad al-Nasir. It was originally used as military parade ground and staging area but was also used as a camping ground for caravans and as a promenade and entertainment ground in the evenings. On the south side of the square was the Kasbah Bou Jeloud, a formerly walled compound that was occupied by the authorities and by the governor of Fes from the Almohad period to the 20th century, but which today is a common neighbourhood.

For a long time, the middle of the square was occupied by a large, rectangular, Marinid-era building that served as stables and was known as the Herri Bou Jloud. The city walls on the western side of the square, adjoining the city's main western gate, Bab Mahrouk, were also lined with small chambers or shelters for the soldiers who kept watch at night, while the northern and eastern parts of the square were also occupied by miscellaneous structures such as warehouses and a marabout's tomb.

== Description ==
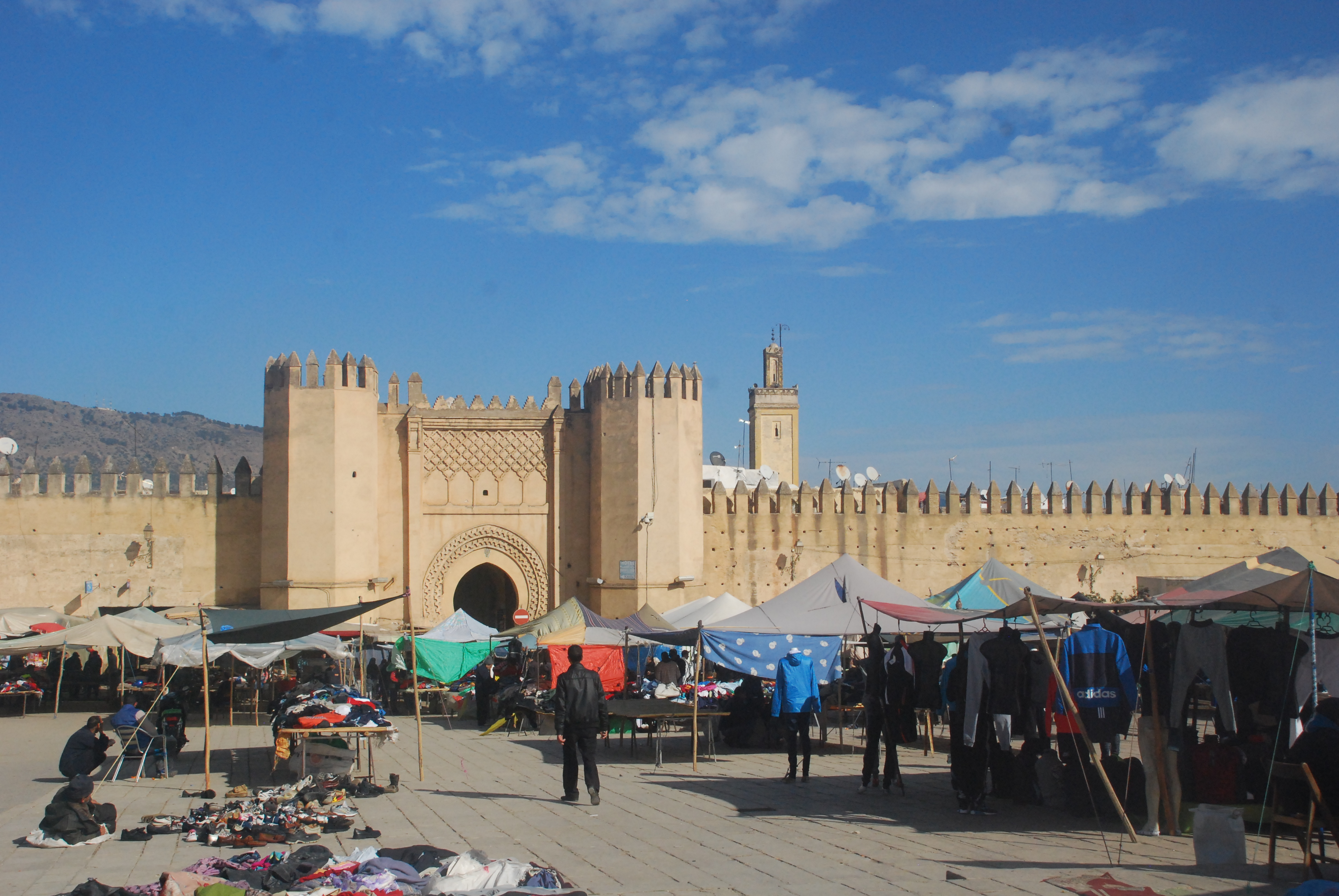
Bab Chorfa and the market on the northern side of the square.

The square is bordered by Bab Mahrouk and the city walls of Fes el Bali to the west, by the Kasbah en-Nouar to the north (including the Bab Chorfa gate), and by the former Kasbah Bou Jeloud to the south. To the south today is also the Lycée Moulay Idris, Morocco's first "modern" secondary school, founded in 1917. The Bou Jeloud Mosque, established in the Almohad period, also stands nearby to the southeast, on the site of the former Kasbah Bou Jeloud.

== Present-day use ==
Today the square is still used for various events, such as one of the venues for the World Sacred Music Festival. The northern part of the square, in front of Bab Chorfa gate, is the site of a long-running open-air market selling low-cost goods to local residents.

As of 2022, the square was undergoing extensive renovation for the construction of a new large-scale parking facility that will serve the old city of Fes.
