= Diwan Mosque =

Mosque in Fez, Morocco

- مسجد الديوان
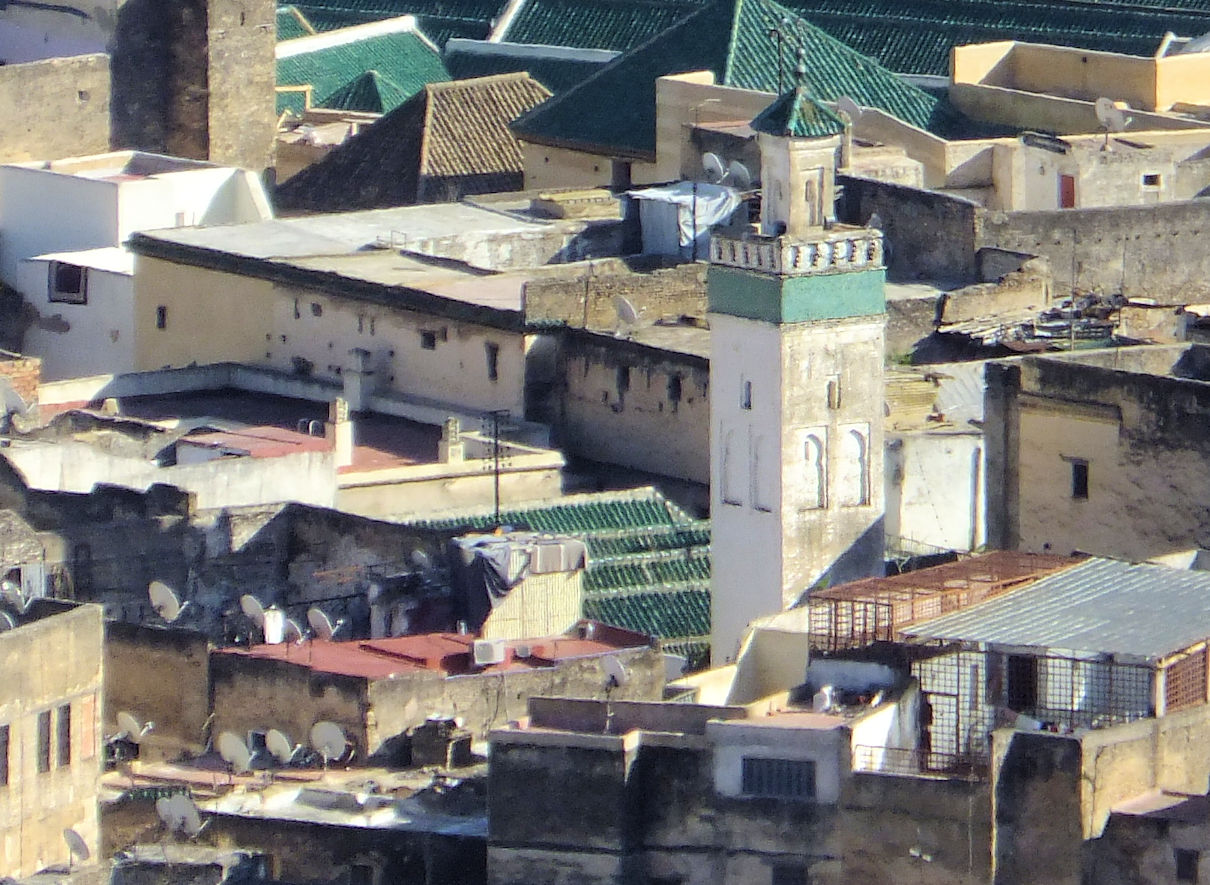

Religion
- Affiliation: Sunni Islam

Location
- Location: Fez, Morocco
- Interactive map of Diwan Mosque
- Coordinates: 34°03′56″N 4°58′26.8″W

Architecture
- Type: Mosque
- Established: Between 1792 and 1822

The Diwan Mosque (Arabic: مسجد الديوان; also spelled Diouane Mosque) is a mosque in Fez, Morocco. It was founded by the Alawi sultan Moulay Slimane during his reign between 1792 and 1822. It is located in the center of Fes el-Bali (the old city), on Diwan Street (Rue Diwan), just north of Tala'a Kebira near its eastern end. It is one of the neighbourhood Friday mosques of the city.

== See also ==
- Lists of mosques
- List of mosques in Africa
- List of mosques in Morocco
