= Collège Moulay Idriss =

School in Fez, Morocco

Coordinates: 34°03′37.6″N 4°59′8.4″W

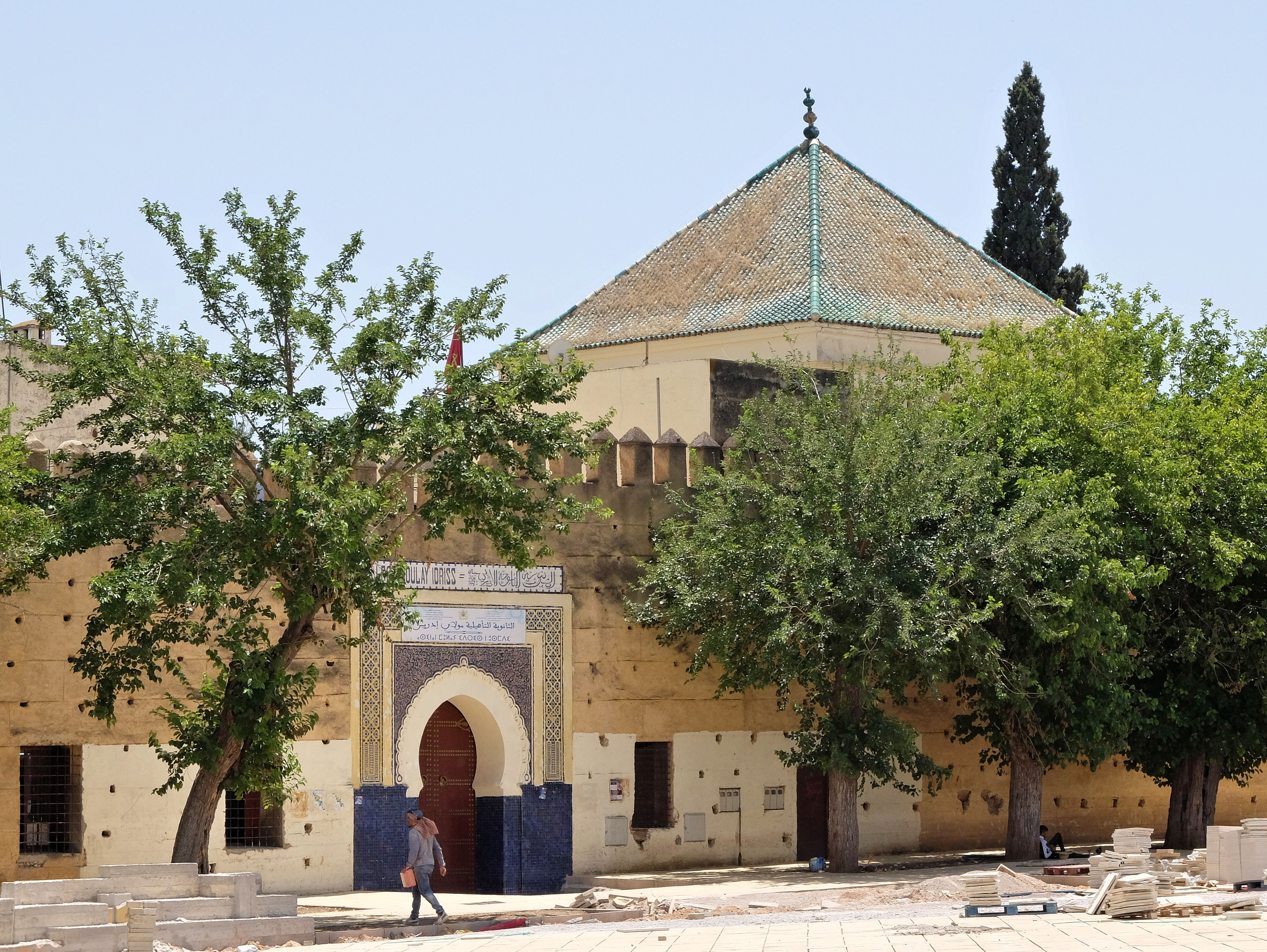
Entrance to the college on Place Bou Jeloud

The Collège Moulay Idriss, known today as the Lycée Moulay Idriss, is a historic secondary school in Fez, Morocco.

== History ==
The school was originally opened in 1914 as a Collège Musulman, part of a new system of secular French schools in Morocco initiated by the French Protectorate administration. The schools offered a modern European-style curriculum as an alternative to traditional education systems which already existed, and were intended to educate the children of elite Moroccan families which worked with or for the new French colonial administration. The college in Fez was the first of what was initially only two such schools, with the second one opened in Rabat in 1916. In 1923 the school was renamed Collège Moulay Idriss, while the one in Rabat became the Collège Moulay Youssef. The school was initially reserved for boys; a separate school system for girls was also created in parallel. The curriculum was about evenly divided between French and Arabic, and included both modern sciences and traditional Islamic disciplines.

The school was led by French principals up until the advent of Moroccan independence. In 1959, Aziz Abdelaziz Aïouch, previously a figure in the Moroccan nationalist movement, became the first Moroccan principal to take over its administration.

== Architecture ==
The complex is noted for its emulation of traditional Moroccan architecture, but was designed by French architect René Canu. The traditional architecture, along with the organisation of the school system itself, was meant to evoke a certain sense of continuity with the established order and traditions. The main school building was designed in the style of a large traditional palace courtyard, filled with a riad garden divided symmetrically with a marble fountain in the middle. The courtyards of the school are surrounded by arched porticos, while the hallways and galleries behind these are decorated and paved with colourful zellij tiles.
