= Bab Mahrouk =

City gate in Fes, Morocco

- باب المحروق
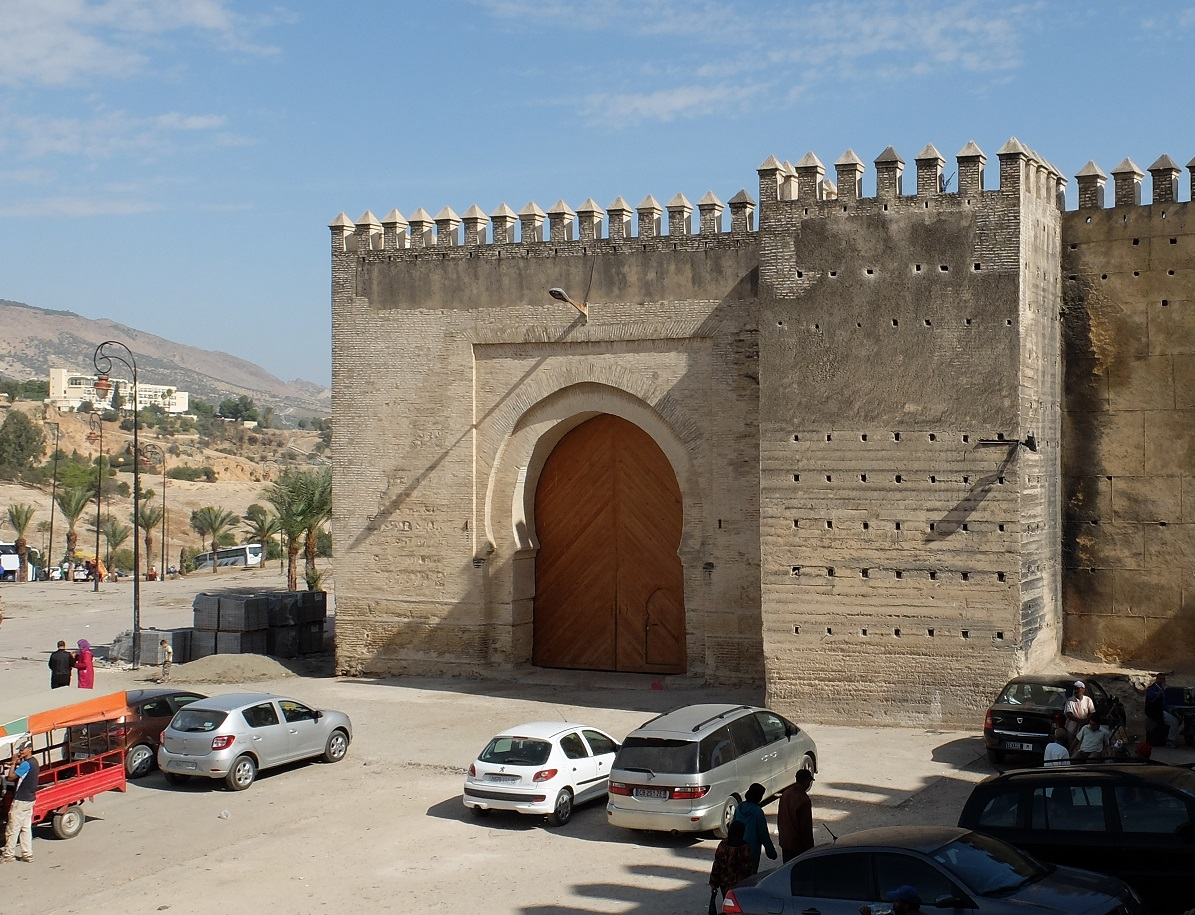
- Interactive map of the Bab Mahrouk area

General information
- Type: city gate
- Architectural style: Almohad, Moorish, Moroccan
- Location: Fez, Morocco
- Coordinates: 34°03′45″N 4°59′9.8″W
- Completed: circa 1212

Bab Mahrouk, also spelled Bab Mahruq, (Arabic: باب المحروق ) is historically the main western city gate of Fes el Bali, the old walled city of Fes, Morocco. The gate dates from 1204 and is located on the northwestern corner of Place Bou Jeloud, near the edge of Kasbah an-Nouar. It was historically the approximate starting point of the old city's main street, Tala'a Kebira.

== History ==
The current gate was built in 1204 by the Almohad ruler Muhammad al-Nasir (ruled 1199-1213), who rebuilt the city walls and fortifications of Fes generally. It was also known (perhaps at an earlier period before the Almohad construction) as Bab ash-Shari'a (باب الشريعة meaning roughly "Gate of Justice/Law"), but became known as Bab Mahruq ("Gate of the Burnt") after the body of a Wazzani rebel called al-'Ubaydi was burnt here in 1203-04 (600 AH). The heads of executed rebels were hung here on display, a practice that continued on occasion even up to the beginning of the 20th century. On some occasions the condemned were hung by the wrists just above the ground for a full day before their execution. Today the gate is still standing but several other openings in the wall have been created nearby to allow for the passage of vehicles and regular traffic.

== Description ==
Like many medieval fortified gates, the gate has a bent entrance, entered from the west but turning 90 degrees to the south. It opens through a large horseshoe or Moorish arch, surrounded by a shallow rectangular frame (similar to Bab Mahrouk on the other side of the city). Another simple opening in the walls, inserted in recent times for better circulation, can also be found to the south of the gate structure.

West of the gate, outside the city walls, stretches the historic Bab Mahrouk Cemetery, one of the main cemeteries of the old city. It includes the mausoleum of 12th-century Islamic scholar Abu Bakr ibn al-Arabi. Ibn al-Khatib, the famous Andalusi poet from Granada, was also buried there after he was killed while jailed in Fez in 1375. One of the tombs in the cemetery may contain the final resting place of Muhammad XI, the last ruler of Granada and al-Andalus, though experts have yet to confirm this.

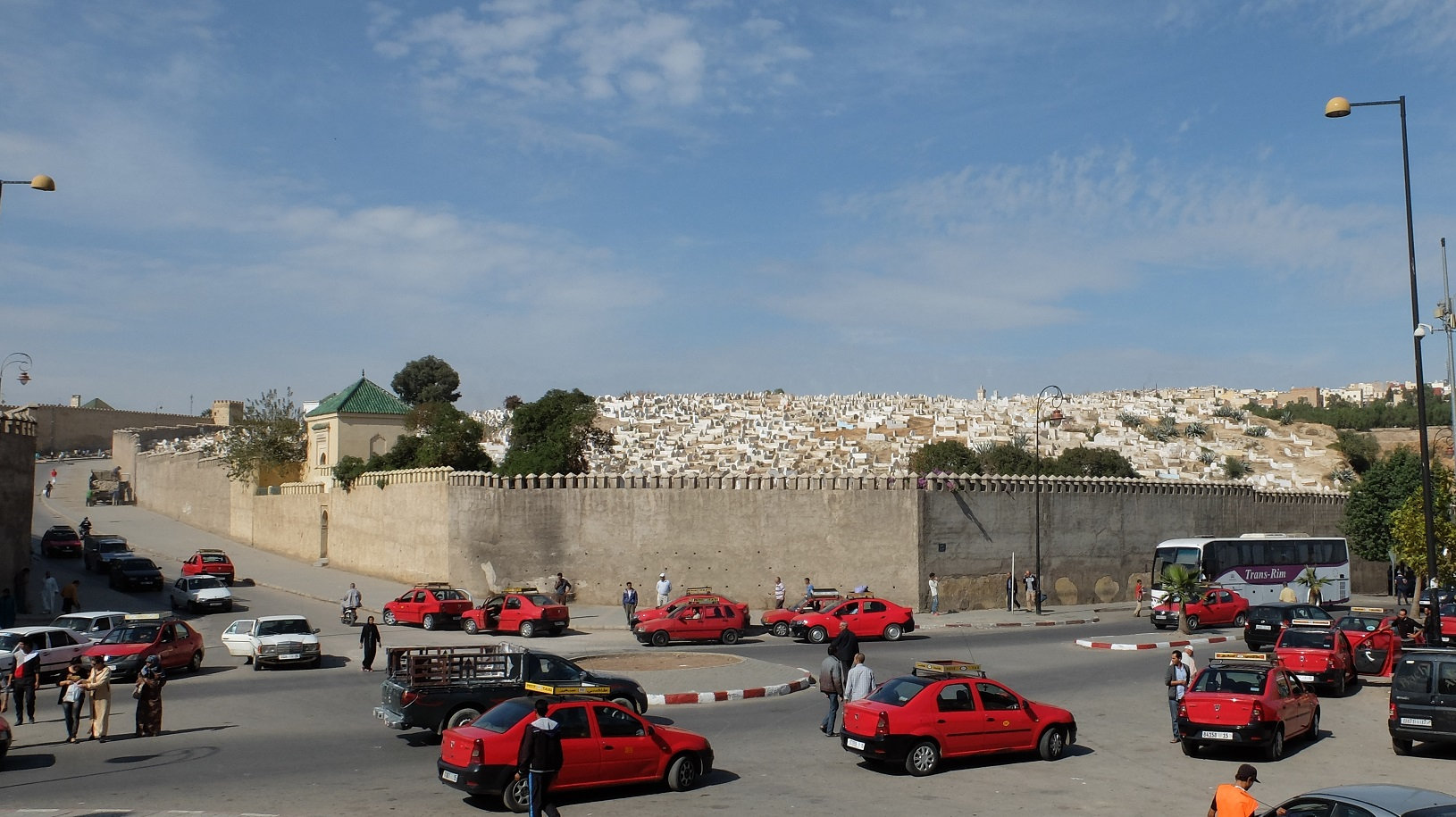
Bab Mahrouk Cemetery

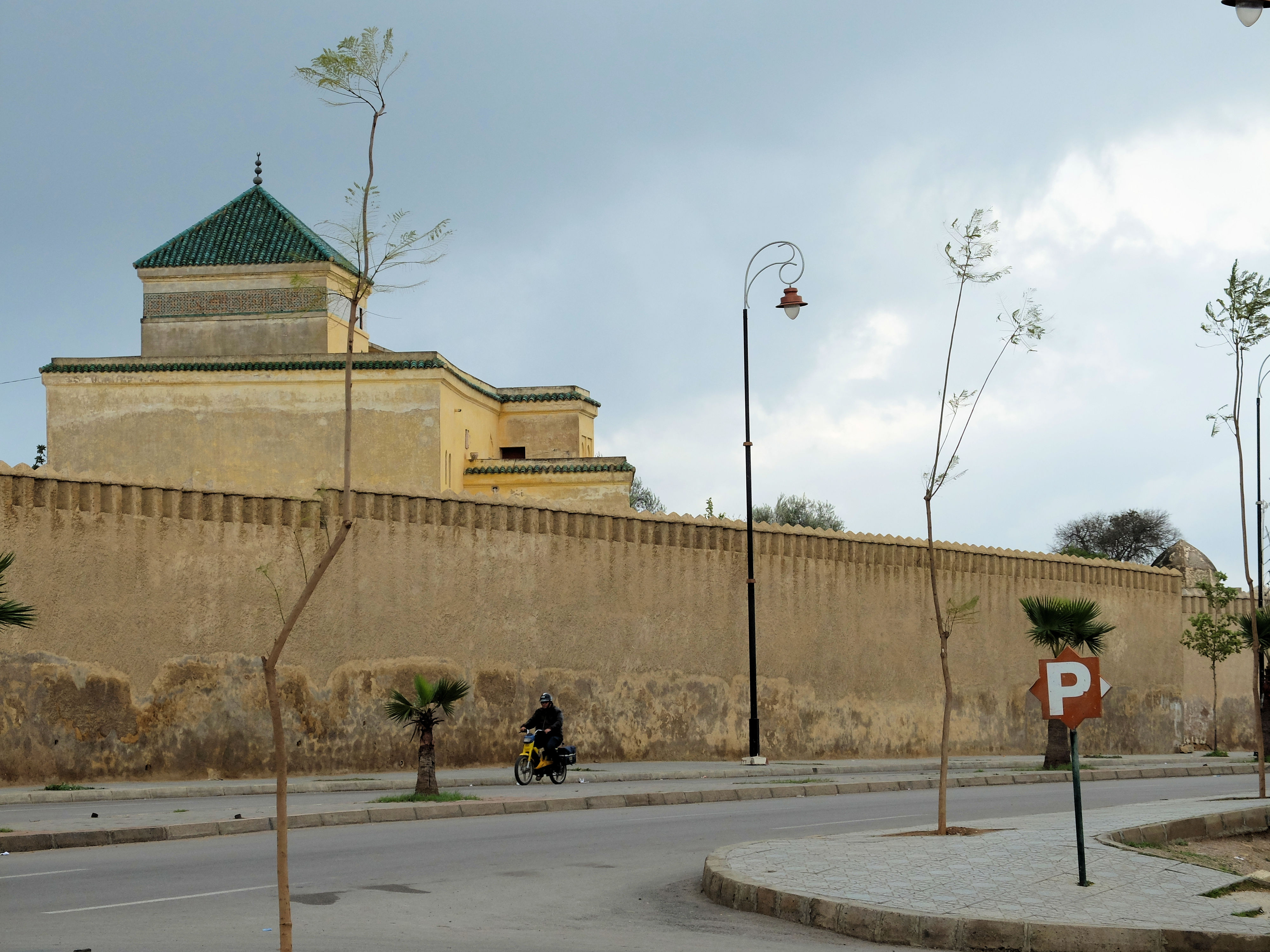
Mausoleum of Abu Bakr Ibn al-Arabi

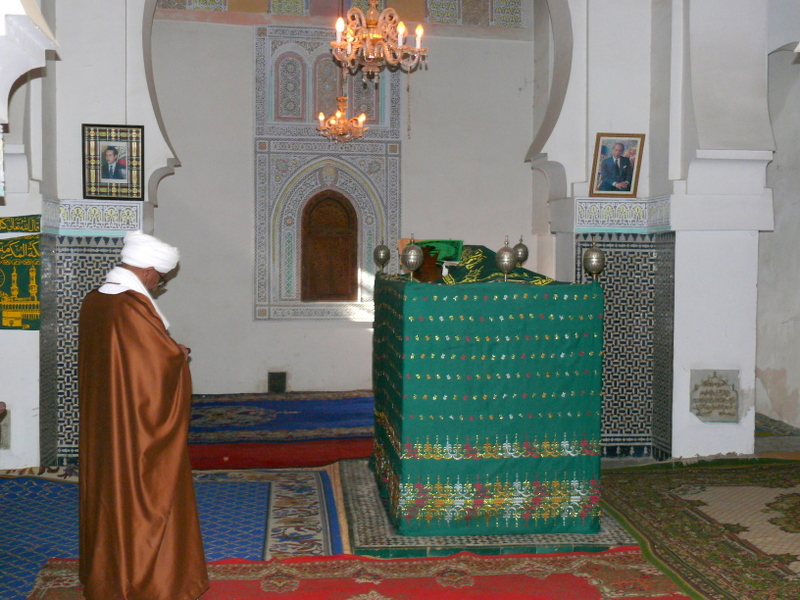
Interior of the mausoleum of Ibn al-Arabi
