= Bou Jeloud Mosque =

Mosque in Fez, Morocco

- جامع بوجلود
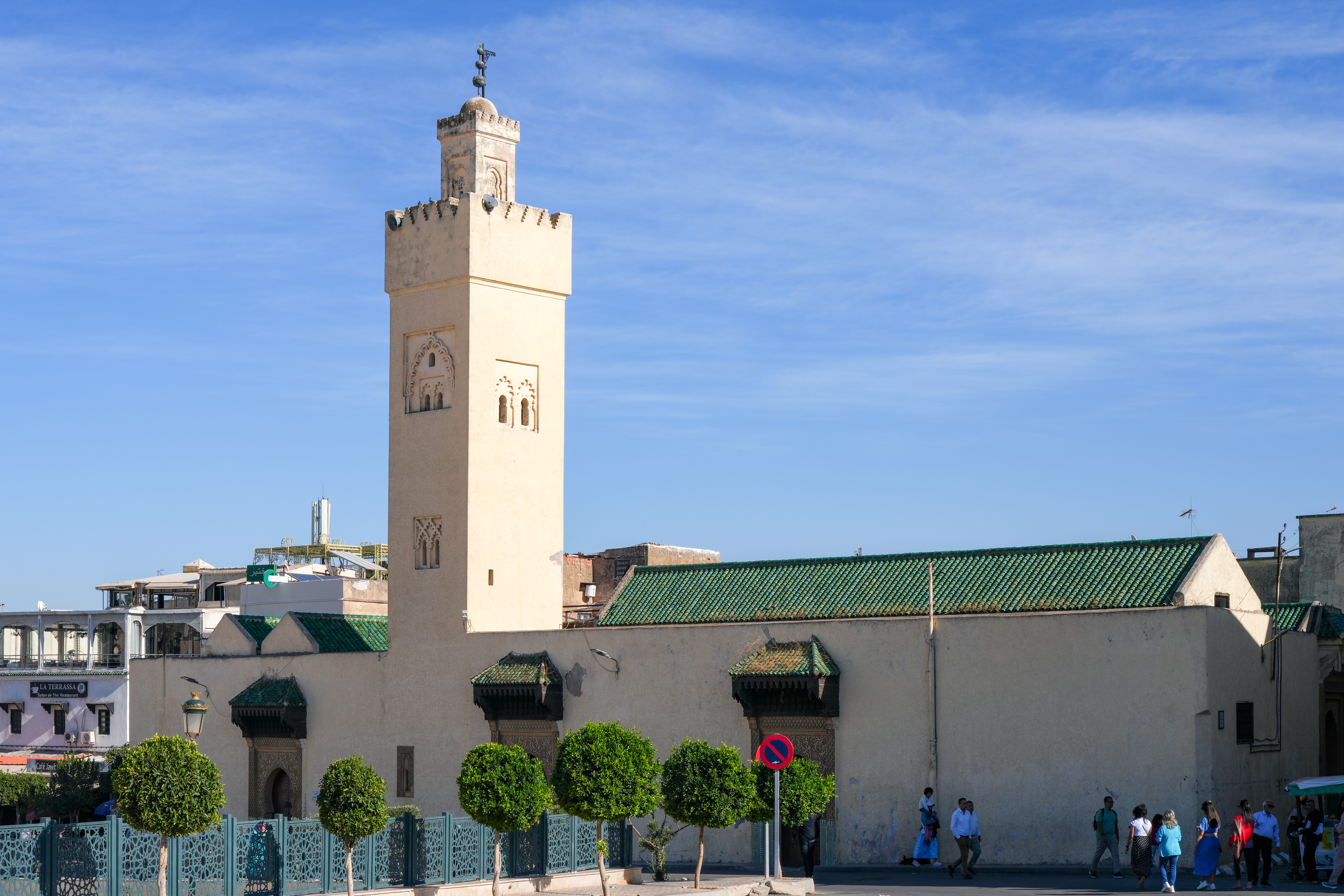

- Location within Morocco

Religion
- Affiliation: Sunni Islam
- Status: active

Location
- Location: Fes, Morocco
- Interactive map of Bou Jeloud Mosque
- Coordinates: 34°03′39.8″N 4°59′4.5″W

Architecture
- Type: Mosque
- Style: Moorish (Almohad, Marinid)
- Founder: Abu Yusuf Yaqub al-Mansur
- Established: between 1184 and 1199

Specifications
- Minaret: 1
- Materials: brick

The Bou Jeloud Mosque (Arabic: جامع بوجلود) is a historic Almohad-era mosque in the former Kasbah of Bou Jeloud, located near Bab Bou Jeloud, in Fez, Morocco.

== History ==
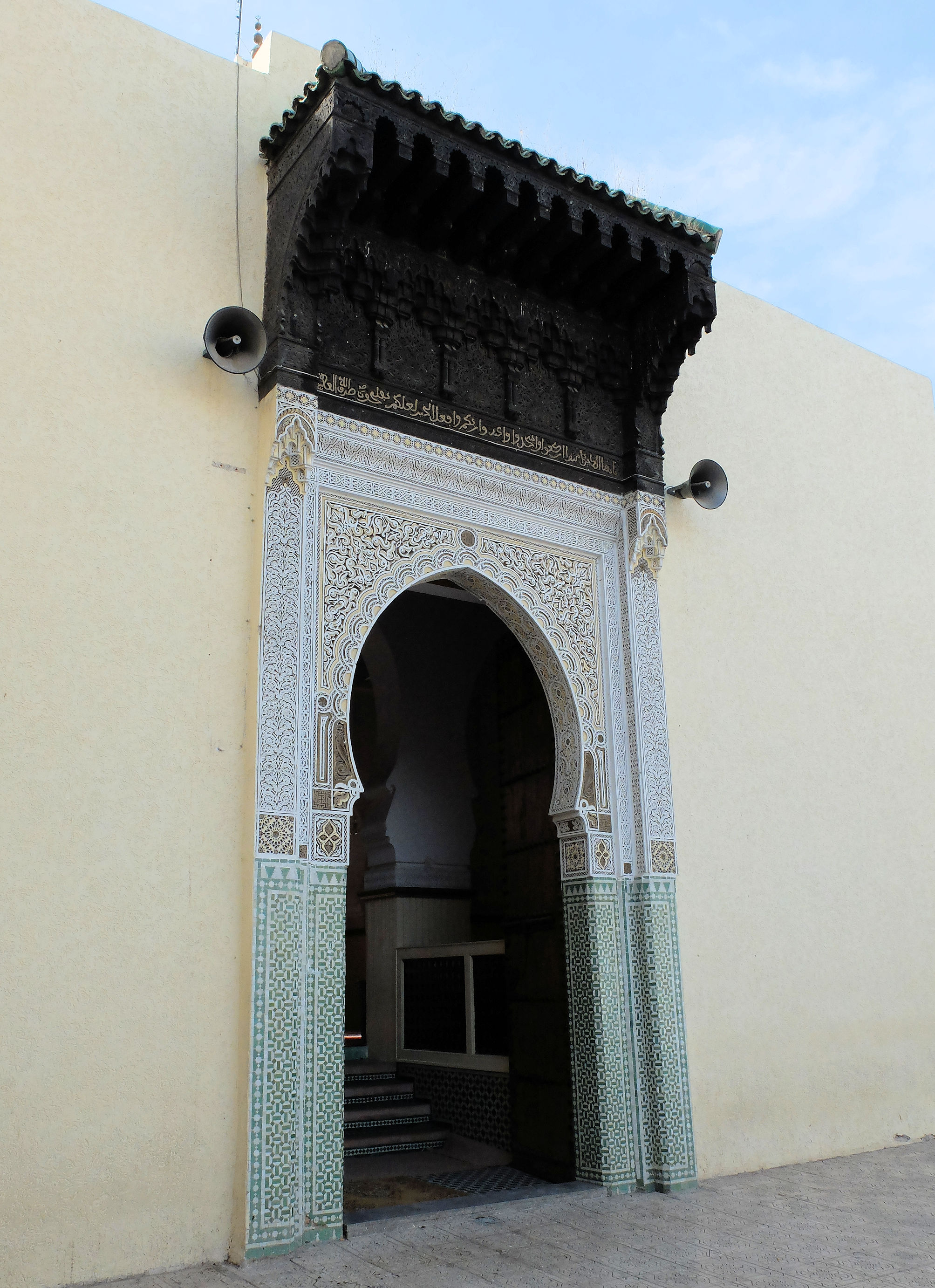
One of the mosque's entrances.

According to scholar Henri Terrasse, the mosque was founded by the Almohad caliph Abu Yusuf Yaqub al-Mansur, who ruled between 1184 and 1199 CE. (Although Richard Parker attributes the foundation of the mosque to Muhammad al-Nasir, between 1199 and 1214.) This makes it one of the oldest monuments in the city and one of the few Almohad mosques in Fez. At the time, al-Mansur had ordered the reconstruction of the fortifications of Fez after their destruction by his predecessor Abd al-Mu'min after 1145, though the reconstruction was only completed under his successor Muhammad al-Nasir. The mosque was founded on the site of the former Almoravid kasbah (citadel) on the western outskirts of Fez, on a plateau above the rest of the city. Under Muhammad al-Nasir, this kasbah, known as the Kasbah Bou Jeloud, was rebuilt and the mosque was made a part of it, serving as the citadel's main mosque.

Despite the destruction under Abd al-Mu'min, Fez saw a period of prosperity and growth under the stability of the Almohads. By the time of al-Mansur's reign, the city had already expanded westwards up to this area. These westernmost districts were quite distant from the main Friday mosques at the center of the city (i.e. the al-Qarawiyyin and the al-Andalus Mosque). Thus, part of the motivation in founding this new mosque may have been to provide a Friday mosque (which held the khutba or Friday sermon, an important religious service) closer to the western neighbourhoods of the city and to the Almohad garrisons. The Bou Jeloud Mosque was thus only the third Friday mosque to be built in Fez at that point. (Later on, the tradition of building a Friday mosque for every neighbourhood became more established in Morocco and the number of Friday mosques in Fez multiplied significantly.)

In 1248 the Marinids, under their leader Abu Yahya, captured Fez from the Almohads. Abu Yahya was responsible for building the current minaret of the Bou Jeloud Mosque, as attested by a foundation inscription. (This is in fact the first Marinid foundation inscription on a monument.) The Wattasid dynasty (late 15th to mid-16th centuries) later restored the mosque and slightly expanded it on its western side. In the 19th century, under the Alawi sultans, the minaret was repaired and further heightened, while the entrance doorways were remade in their current style. Aside from other minor repairs and modifications across the centuries, the mosque has generally maintained its Almohad design.

== Architecture ==
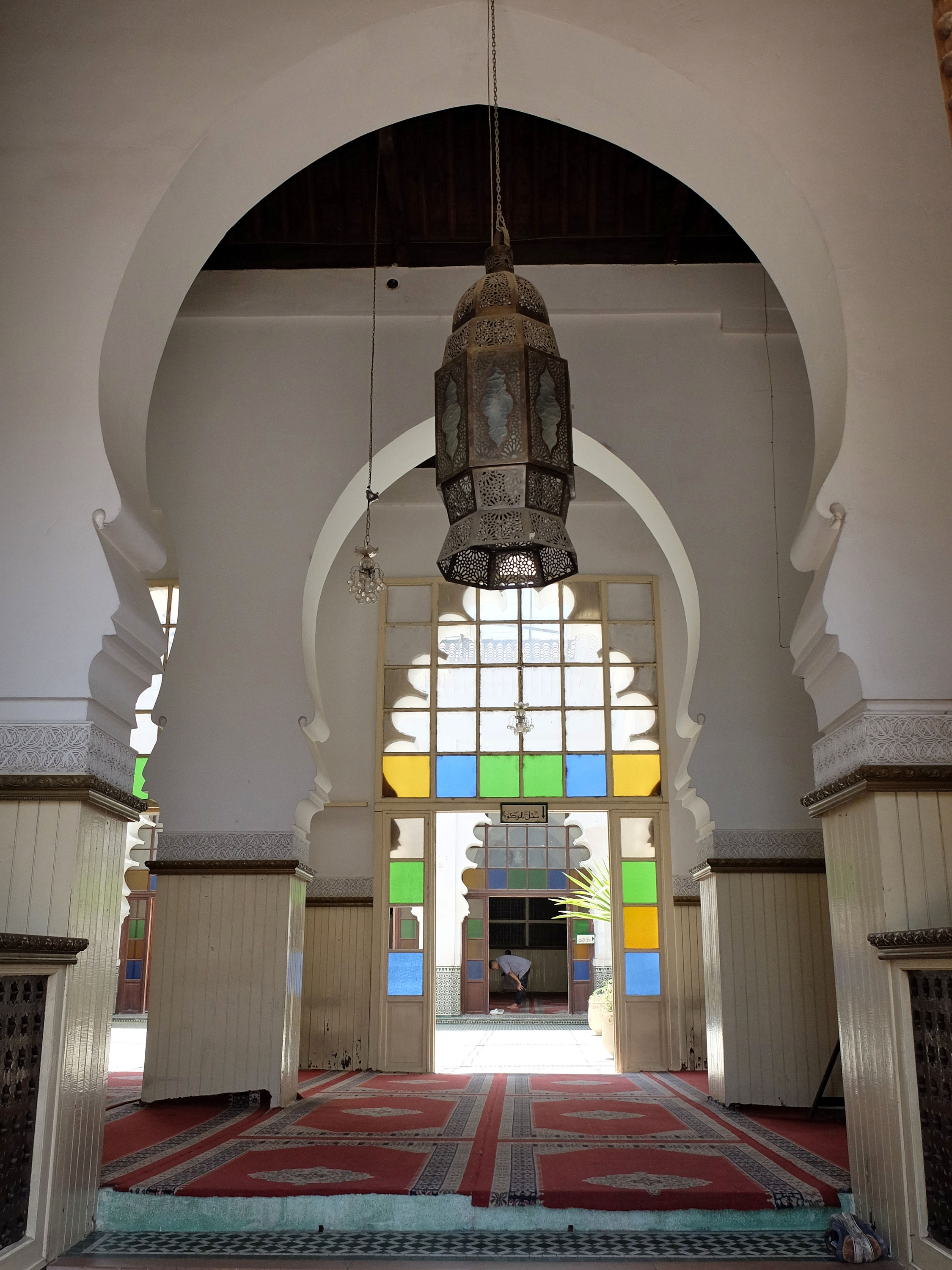
View into the mosque interior, with pointed horseshoe arches and polylobed arches

The mosque has similar characteristics to most medieval Moroccan mosques. It is mostly built with brick, covered in whitewash. The interior of the mosque is a hypostyle hall with multiple rows of horseshoe arches, with aisles or "naves" running between them. The southernmost aisle of the hall, running along the qibla wall (i.e. the wall towards which prayers are aligned) is wider than the others. The hall is wrapped around a square courtyard (sahn) with a fountain in the center. In the rectangular floor plan of the original mosque there were three aisles and rows of arches to the west, east, and south of the courtyard, while on the north side was a single aisle forming a gallery. The Wattasid-era expansion, however, added an irregular quadrilateral extension to the west, with an oblique outer wall, making the overall floor plan today asymmetrical. On the southern (qibla) wall of the prayer hall, the mihrab (niche symbolizing the direction of prayer) is aligned with the central axis of the courtyard. The original entrance of the mosque was likely located on this same axis, on the opposite northern side of the mosque; however, the Marinid-era minaret appears to have been built on this location, blocking the original entrance, and other entrances were opened up instead to the west and east. On either side of the mihrab is a door that leads to a small annex behind the mosque, which may have served as a storage room for the minbar (mosque pulpit) and as the imam's chamber.

The decoration of the mosque is relatively austere, as with many Almohad mosques. Both the mihrab and the minbar were redone after the Almohad period. The mihrab features some carved decoration and the usual small cupola of muqarnas sculpting inside its niche. The arches of the mosque are horseshoe-shaped, but the arches at the corners of the courtyard are polylobed and have a more pointed overall profile, a feature typical of Almohad design. The entrance portals of the mosque today are decorated with stucco carvings and wooden canopies that date from the Alawi era. The minaret is decorated with polylobed blind arches around the windows.

== See also ==
- Lists of mosques
- List of mosques in Africa
- List of mosques in Morocco
