= Bent entrance =

Defensive feature in medieval fortification

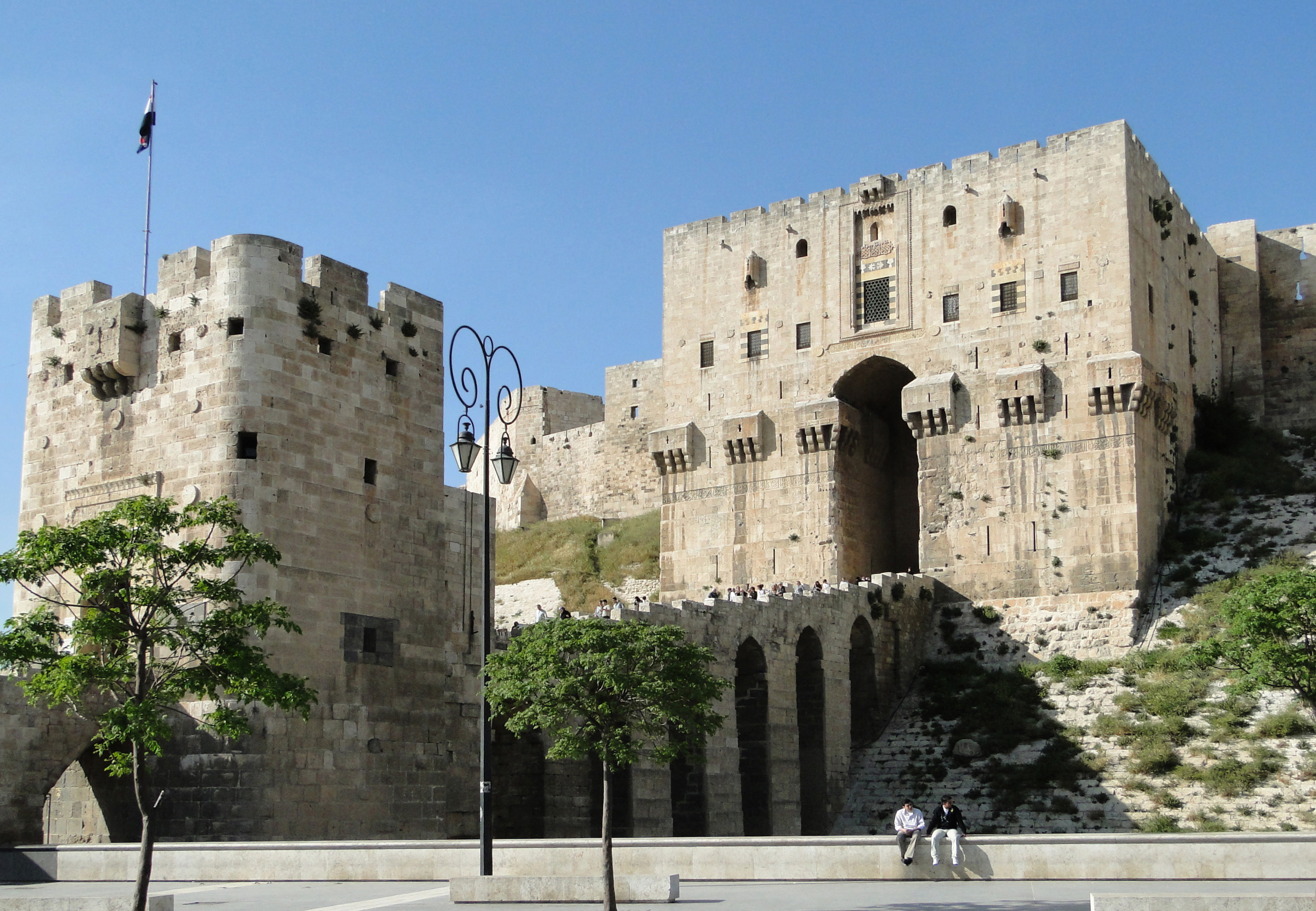
Bent entrance of Citadel of Aleppo, Syria

A bent or indirect entrance is a defensive feature in medieval fortification. In a castle with a bent entrance, the gate passage is narrow and turns sharply. Its purpose is to slow down attackers attempting to rush the gate and impede the use of battering rams against doors. It is often combined with means for an active defence, such as machicolations, in effect confining intruders to a narrow killing zone. Its defensive function is related to that of a barbican in front of the gate.

Indirect entrances are typical of Arab and Armenian fortifications, as well as crusader castles. The Citadel of Aleppo is a good example of the former, with a massive gate tower enclosing a complicated passage. The most elaborate bent entrance among crusader castles is the turning entrance ramp at Crac des Chevaliers, which is defensible from several towers and via machicolations, but the indirect entrance to the Hospitaller castle at Bayt Jibrin is also complex. In addition to the main gate, postern gates could also feature a bent entrance, usually on a smaller scale. For instance, in the ruined Hospitaller castle at Belvoir, posterns open into the moat at the angle between the outer wall and the corner towers.

Bent entrances of such complexity as at Crac are less common in European castles, where even in strongly defended keep-gatehouses the entrance passage tends to be straight. See for example the long gate passage at Harlech Castle, which uses multiple doors and murder-holes, but no turns. Cathcart King has argued that the indirect entrance was less widespread in Europe than in the Crusader states because transport in Europe tended to be based on carts pulled by draft animals, which makes negotiating a twisting passage impractical, whereas camels, as used in the East, would have less difficulty.
