= History of the Jews in Morocco =

Map of historical Jewish communities in Morocco

The history of the Jews in Morocco goes back to ancient times. Moroccan Jews constitute an ancient community, with the oldest irrefutable evidence of Judaism in Morocco dating to the Roman period. After the Muslim conquest of the Maghreb, Jews would become the primary religious minority group, particularly after the Almohad period and the departure or conversion of Christians.

The Jewish communities in Morocco have historically been diverse, with significant differences between urban and rural populations, Toshavim and Megorashim, and inhabitants of different cities and regions. It was not uncommon for different Jewish communities in Morocco to speak different languages, including Darija, Tamazight, Haketia, or French.

Jews in Morocco traditionally lived together in communities, whether in Jewish villages in rural areas or, particularly after the 15th century (and especially from the 19th century), in an urban mellāḥ, or Jewish quarter. In the 19th century, due to economic transformations and the proliferation of European industrial imports competing with traditional Jewish crafts, there was a major migration of Jews from the rural hinterland to coastal cities. Some elite Jewish merchants in the service of the Makhzen, known as Tujjār as-Sultān, handled much of the kingdom's long-distance trade, especially in Essaouira.

The Alliance Israélite Universelle, a Paris-based organization that sought to improve the lives of Jews through a French education, opened its first school in Tétouan in 1862. The AIU helped create a class of Westernized Jews in Morocco's coastal cities, many of whom benefited from the protégé system, accentuating differences between Morocco's urban and rural Jewish communities.

The Zionist movement in Morocco appeared in the early 20th century and spread slowly over the following decades through various forms of advocacy and substantial external backing. Only after the establishment of the State of Israel in Palestine in 1948 was there any significant emigration of Moroccan Jews. Through Cadima and Operation Yachin, about 60,000 and 90,000 Moroccan Jews migrated to Israel, respectively. In 1948, there were about 265,000 Jews in Morocco, with a maximum of between 250,000 and 350,000 at its peak in the 1950s. At that time, the Jewish community in Morocco was the largest in the Muslim world. By 2017, 2,000-3,000 remained. In 2025, the Jewish population in Morocco numbered 1,000.

== History ==
=== Origins ===
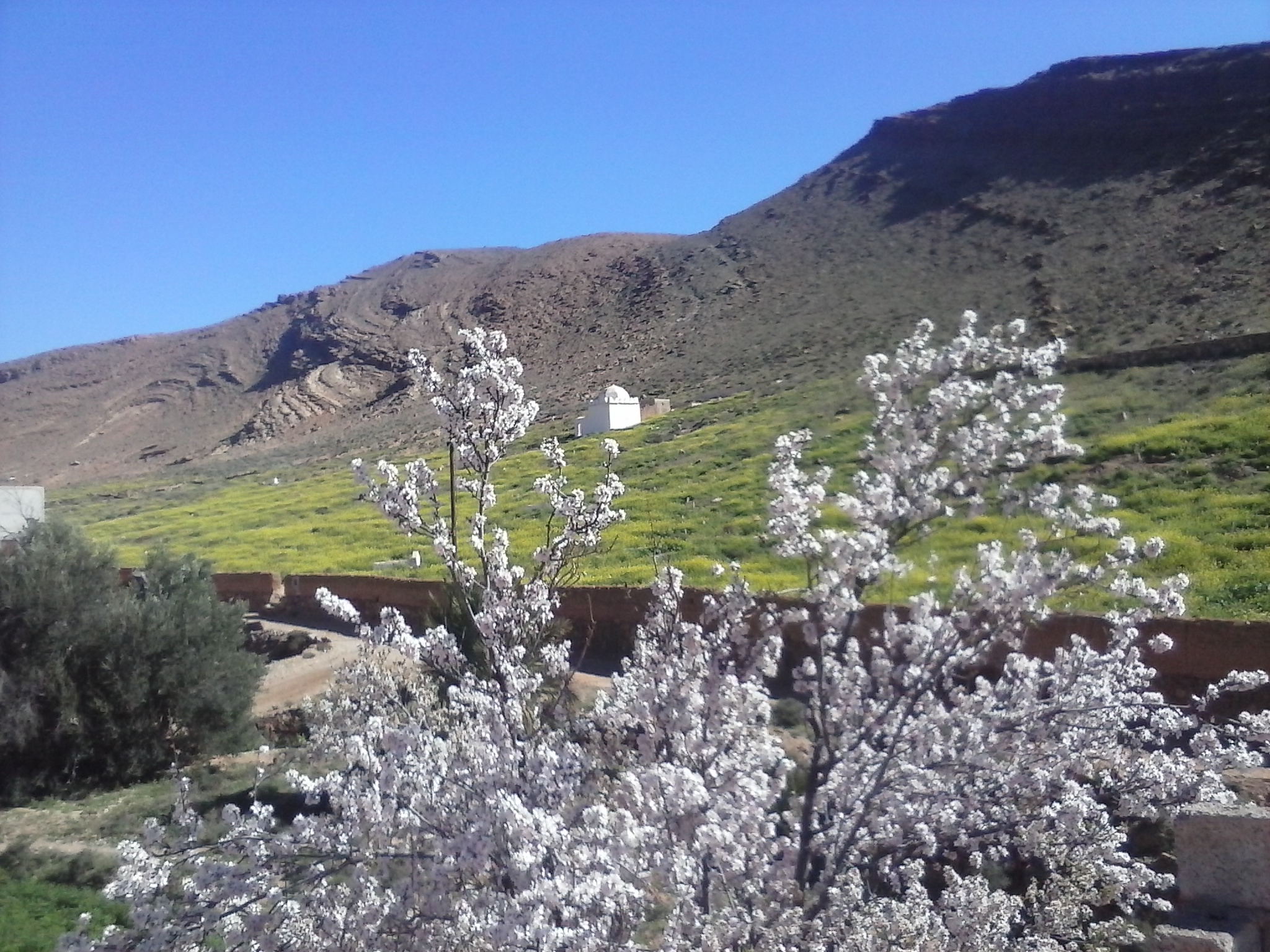
Ifrane Atlas-Saghir in the Anti-Atlas, known to Jews as Oufrane, is believed to be the oldest Jewish community in Morocco, speculatively dated to the year 361 BCE.

It is possible that some Jews fled to North Africa after the destruction of the First Temple in the sixth century BCE or the destruction of the Second Temple in the first century CE. It is also possible that they arrived on Phoenician boats (1500 BCE - 539 BCE). There is also a theory, supported by Ibn Khaldun, that Moroccan Jews were indigenous Imazighen (Berbers) who converted to Judaism, although the question of who converted them remains, and this theory has been rejected by most scholars. The Jewish community of Ifran, from the Tamazight word ifri meaning cavern, is supposed to date back to 361 BCE and is believed to be the oldest Jewish community in what is now Morocco.

=== Under the Romans ===
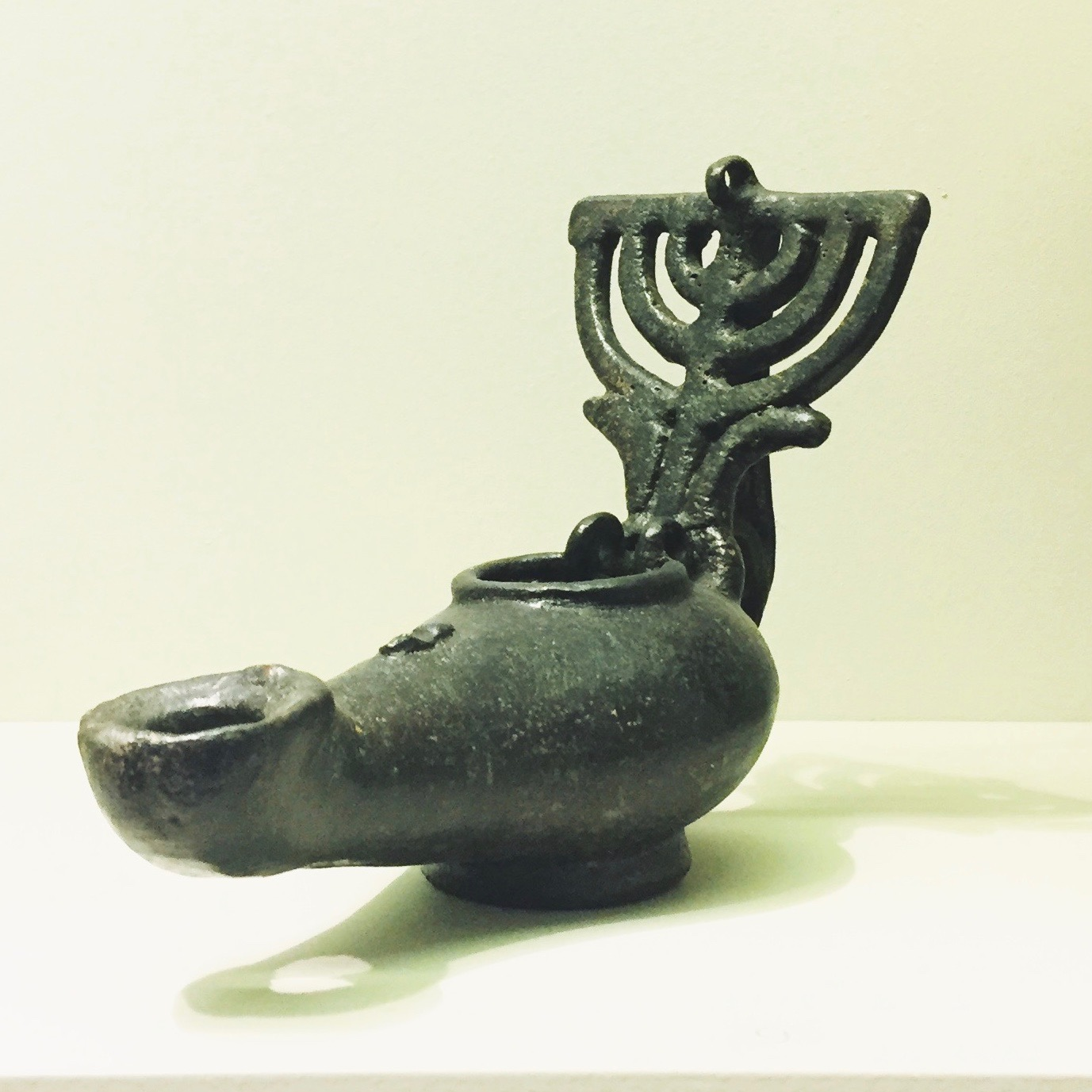
A 4th-5th century CE bronze oil lamp of the Roman period in the shape of a menorah, found at the ruins of Volubilis.

The first irrefutable evidence of Jews in what is now Morocco, in the form of gravestone epitaphs in Hebrew at Volubilis and the ruins of a third century synagogue, dates back to late antiquity. This epigraphic evidence includes inscriptions in Hebrew, Greek, and Latin; "Matrona, daughter of Rabbi Yehuda, [may she] rest [in peace]" (מטרונא בת רבי יהודה נח) is inscribed in Hebrew, the only Hebrew inscription from the first centuries CE in the region. Emily Gottreich contends that Jewish migration to Morocco predates the full formation of Judaism, as the Talmud was "written and redacted between 200 and 500 CE."

As Christianity was adopted by the Roman state, the church Councils of Carthage adopted policies that discriminated against adherents to Judaism. The Justinian edict of persecution for North Africa, issued after Vandal rule had been overthrown and Mauretania had come under the dominion of the Byzantines (534), was directed against the Jews as well as the Arians, the Donatists, and other dissenters.

In the 7th century, the Jewish population of Mauretania received as a further accession from Iberian Peninsula those who wished to escape Visigothic legislation. At the end of the same century, at the time of the great Arab conquests in northwestern Africa, there were in Mauretania, according to the Arab historians, many Jews.

=== Arab conquest and the Idrisids (703–1146) ===
Since the city of Fez was founded in 789 CE, it attracted a diverse kind of population from all around the area, among those new newcomers came the Jews who contributed their commercial capabilities to the new developed economy. They settled in the medina of Fez, and formed a stable community, which was an integral part of the city life. The golden age of the Jewish community in Fez lasted for almost three hundred years, from the 9th to 11th centuries. Its yeshivot (religious schools) attracted brilliant scholars, poets and grammarians. This period was marred by the 1033 Fez massacre. However, it is described by the Jewish Virtual Library as an isolated event primarily due to political conflict between the Maghrawa and Ifrenid tribes.

=== Under the Almoravids ===
The Almoravid dynasty (Arabic: المرابطون, romanized: Al-Murābiṭūn, lit. 'those from the ribats') was an imperial Berber Muslim dynasty originating in the Sahara whose empire eventually extended from Lisbon and Valencia to Awdaghust and Gao. Their religious fervor and fighting capabilities enabled them to establish a formidable empire in the Morocco and Muslim Spain in the 11th and 12th centuries. Their theological Islamic zeal is attributed to Yahya ibn Ibrahim, their spiritual leader, as well as to the 'alim (religious scholar) 'Abd Allah ibn Yasin.

In the Sahara, the Almoravids probably had minimal contact with Jews, though there were Jewish merchant communities in oases and towns. As the Almoravids incorporated the cities of Sijilmasa, Awdaghust, and Aghmat, they came to rule over their Jewish communities. Yusuf ibn Tashfin imposed high taxes on the Jewish merchant community of Aghmat in 1071, perhaps enforcing a jizya tax. Muhammad al-Idrisi also indicates a preference for segregation in Aghmat and Marrakesh under the Almoravids. Jewish communities of the western Maghreb maintained ties with Jewish communities in the Christian kingdoms to the North, in the Islamic east, and throughout the Mediterranean. Although Jewish populations in Ifriqiya, the western Sahara, and al-Andalus were mostly urban at the time of the Almoravids, the western Maghreb had indigenous Judeo-Berber communities living in small villages. It is possible that the Barghawata confederation that the Almoravids fought had a Judeo-Berber background.

The position of the Jews under Almoravid domination was apparently free of major abuses, though there are reports of increasing social hostility against them – particularly in Fez. Unlike the problems encountered by the Jews during the rule of the Almohads (the Almoravids' successor dynasty), there are not many factual complaints of excesses, coercion, or malice on the part of the authorities toward the Jewish communities. It is known, however, that Yusuf Ibn Tashfin forbade Jews living in the capital city Marrakesh. It was allowed for them to trade there, but if a Jew was caught in the city during night hours it was punishable by death.

Under the Almoravids, some Jews prospered (although far more so under Ali III, than under his father Yusuf ibn Tashfin). Among those who held the title of "vizier" (وزير) or "nasih" (ناصح) in Almoravid times were the poet and physician Abu Ayyub Solomon ibn al-Mu'allam, Abraham ibn Meïr ibn Kamnial, Abu Isaac ibn Muhajar, and Solomon ibn Farusal.

From the traditional Iberian historiographical perspective, the Almoravids and Almohads are seen as having disrupted the convivencia of medieval Iberia.

=== Under the Almohads (1146–15th century) ===
The Dhimmi status, which called for the payment of jizya (taxes for non-Muslims) in exchange for a certain level of protection for religious minorities, came to an end under the strict militant dynasty of the Almohads, who came into power in 1146. Instead, the Almohads forced Jews to choose between conversion to Islam or death, compelling many Jews to convert, or at least pretend to. Due to the many similarities between Jewish and Islamic practice, Jews felt as though they could clandestinely maintain their Jewish practices under the guise of Islam. Maimonides, who was staying in Fez with his father, is said to have written to the communities to comfort and encourage his brethren and fellow believers in this time of oppression In the above-mentioned elegy of Abraham ibn Ezra, which appears to have been written at the commencement of the period of the Almohads, and which is found in a Yemen siddur among the kinot prescribed for the Ninth of Ab, the Moroccan cities Ceuta, Meknes, the Draa River valley, Fez, and Segelmesa are especially emphasized as being exposed to great persecution. Joseph ha-Kohen relates that no remnant of Israel was left from Tangier to Mehdia.

Due to the nature of the forced conversions, the later Almohads were no longer content with the repetition of a mere formula of belief in the unity of God and in the prophetic calling of Muhammad. The third Almohad Prince, Abu Yusuf Ya'qub al-Mansur, spoke on this matter, saying "If I were sure about the sincerity of their Islam, I would let them mix with the Muslims..., and if I were sure of their unbelief, I would kill their men, enslave their offspring, and declare their property spoils for the Muslims. But I am uncertain about their case." Thus, al-Mansur made an effort to distinguish the neo-Muslims from the "true" Muslims. He compelled them to wear distinguishing garments, with a very noticeable yellow cloth for a head-covering; from that time forward the clothing of the Jews formed an important subject in the legal regulations concerning them.

The reign of the Almohads proved to be a disastrous and enduring influence on the position of the Moroccan Jews. Already branded by their clothing as unbelievers, they furthermore became objects of scorn and violent despotic caprice that was difficult to avoid.

An account by Solomon Cohen dated January 1148 CE describes the Almohad conquests:

Abd al-Mumin ... the leader of the Almohads after the death of Muhammad Ibn Tumart the Mahdi ... captured Tlemcen [in the Maghreb] and killed all those who were in it, including the Jews, except those who embraced Islam. ... [In Sijilmasa] One hundred and fifty persons were killed for clinging to their [Jewish] faith. ... One hundred thousand persons were killed in Fez on that occasion, and 120,000 in Marrakesh. The Jews in all [Maghreb] localities [conquered] ... groaned under the heavy yoke of the Almohads; many had been killed, many others converted; none were able to appear in public as Jews.

=== Under the Marinids ===
The Marinid dynasty (Berber: Imrinen, Arabic: Marīniyūn) was a dynasty of Zenata Berber descent that ruled Morocco from the 13th to the 15th century.

The Marinids overtook the Almohads controlling Morocco in 1244, and briefly controlled all the Maghreb in the mid-14th century. They supported the Kingdom of Granada in Al-Andalus in the 13th and 14th centuries; an attempt to gain a direct foothold on the European side of the Strait of Gibraltar was however defeated at the Battle of Salado in 1340 and finished after the Castilian conquest of Algeciras from the Marinids in 1344.

During Marinid rule, Jews were able to return to their religion and practices, once again outwardly professing their Judaism under the protection of the dhimmi status. They were able to re-establish their lives and communities, returning to some sense of normalcy and security. They also established strong vertical relations with the Marinid sultans. When the still-fanatic mobs attacked them in 1275, the Merinid sultan Abu Yusuf Yaqub ibn Abd Al-Haqq intervened personally to save them. The sovereigns of this dynasty benevolently received the Jewish ambassadors of the Christian kings of Spain and admitted Jews among their closest courtiers. Of these Jews, Khalifa b. Waqqāsa (Ruqqasa) became steward of the household of the sultan Abu Yaqub Yusuf an-Nasr and his intimate counselor. A victim of palace intrigues, he was put to death in 1302. His nephew, who was also named Khalifa, held the same office and suffered the same fate (1310). However, there were no repercussions against the Moroccan Jews as a result of the execution of their powerful coreligionists. They were the principal factors in the prosperity of the country. The Sahara gold trade, which was of primary importance, and the exchange with the Christian countries were completely under their control. Their relatives and associates in the kingdom of Aragon financed, when necessary, the navies which defended the Moroccan ports. In addition to the jizya (tax paid by non-Muslims), they paid enormous sums to the treasury in customs duties for their imports and exports. In the outlying areas, particularly in the Atlas region where there were large concentrations of Jews of early origin, the Jews wielded great influence in both the political and spiritual domains. Jewish physicians enjoyed well-deserved renown. The study of Kabbalah, as well as philosophy, was then in vogue. The last Moroccan philosopher of the Middle Ages was Judah b. Nissim ibn Malkah, who was still alive in 1365.

Numerous Fessi Jews converted to Islam throughout the premodern period, but the conversions spiked in the mid-fifteenth century. Powerful families, such as the Bannānī, Ibn Shaqrūn, Bannīs, Barrāda, and Gassūs families, adopted Islam. In 1438, under pressure from the shurafāʾ, Sultan Abū Muḥammad ʿAbd al-Ḥaqq made Jewish merchants with businesses in the qaysāriyya (the main market of Fes el Bali) abandon them and move to the mellah near Dar al-Makhzen in Fes Jdid. Many Fessi Jews chose to become Muslims and keep their homes and livelihoods in Old Fez. They formed a group called the bildiyyīn.

The last ruler of the Marinid dynasty, Abd al-Haqq II, appointed many Jews to high positions. The appointment of Jews to high positions, such as vizier, angered many Muslims, as they viewed such increases in Jewish power as transgressing the dhimmi status. Abd al-Basit b. Khalil, a medieval Moroccan author, claims that Jews became arrogant with their newfound prestige, using their power to command Muslims. This is a clear disruption to the established social order. When the Jewish vizier in Fez, Aaron Batash, struck a Muslim woman, there were public outcries amongst Fez's Muslim population. They demanded the Mufti (Islamic legal expert), under threat of death, to issue a Fatwa (legal opinion) to permit the killing of Jews. The Mufti had no choice but to make these killings permissible. However, the traditional Moroccan account by historian Ahmad Ibn Al-Qadi does not feature a mufti at all, calling the narrative into question. Thus, began the 1465 Moroccan revolution, one of the worst riots in Morocco's history

The native Jewish community in Morocco had shrunk, having been possibly massacred. However, this narrative is disputed because no Jewish source from before the nineteenth century makes any mention of a massacre. Furthermore, as there is documentation of a thriving Jewish community in Fez in the 1470s, Garcia-Arena is skeptical that there was any pogrom against the Jews at all. The Moroccan Jewry began to recover from the events of 1465 under the Wattasid dynasty, a ruling group of Zenata Berbers which had gained control during the fall of the Marinid in 1472.

=== Spanish Expulsion of the Jews ===
By 1249, the Spanish Reconquista had concluded its main phase. During the murderous scenes enacted in 1391 in Spain, Spanish-controlled Seville, and Mallorca, Sephardi Jews from Spain migrated to North Africa in order to escape persecution. As Spanish military forces advanced into Málaga and Granada, many Jews from these regions sought refuge in Morocco and Algiers.

A hundred years later, in 1492, King Ferdinand II of Aragon and Queen Isabella I of Castile issued the Alhambra Decree - an edict ordering the expulsion of practicing Jews from Spain. Consequently, the Jews were driven from Spain, and later from Portugal in 1496 following a similar decree by King Manuel I of Portugal. The sudden inroad of Jews into Morocco and the whole of North Africa was then repeated on a much larger scale.

The Jewish community in Morocco then swelled with the waves of refugees arriving from Spain and Portugal after 1492, increasing the cultural and economic power of the Moroccan Jewish community considerably. Incoming Sephardi Jews tended to be economically better off than their native counterparts, bringing with them specific ideas of culture shaped by centuries of life on the Iberian Peninsula. As a result, the Sephardic scholarly mercantile elite were quick to dominate Jewish communal life in Morocco. A number of natives from Fez fled to Spain over the course of the fifteenth century and returned to Fez following 1492, acting as a unique bridge between the native Jews of Morocco and the newly arrived Sephardim. Among this group, the most outstanding representatives were the Ibn Danan family. Fleeing from Fez in either 1438 or 1465, the Ibn Danans settled in Granada where Rabbi Moses Maimon Ibn Danan and his son Saadiah achieved fame as scholars. Saadiah returned to Fez after the Spanish expulsion and served as a spiritual guide for other exiles, whilst identifying himself with the native Jews. The Ibn Danan family was among the intellectual and financial elite of Fez for centuries, creating alliances across Sephardi families and maintaining a prominent synagogue in Fez.

The arrival of Spanish Jewish refugees brought important changes in city life and within the preexisting Jewish community. Jewish life in the Muslim interior of Morocco became dominated by the Sephardic plutocracy that continued to maintain control of the Moroccan Jewry up until modern times. Each local community had a rigid, or shaykh al-Yahud, who was appointed by the government. The chief figure in the larger Jewish community was the Nagid of the capital, who was invariably a court Jew. Throughout the Moroccan Jewish community, there were famous Sephardic dayyanim such as the Ibn Danans whose authority was largely recognized by Jews within the whole country. However, the influx of refugees also caused overcrowding in the larger cities of Morocco and aroused uneasiness among both the Muslims, who feared an increase in the price of necessities, and the Jews already settled there, who had hitherto barely succeeded in creating a livelihood in handicrafts and petty commerce.

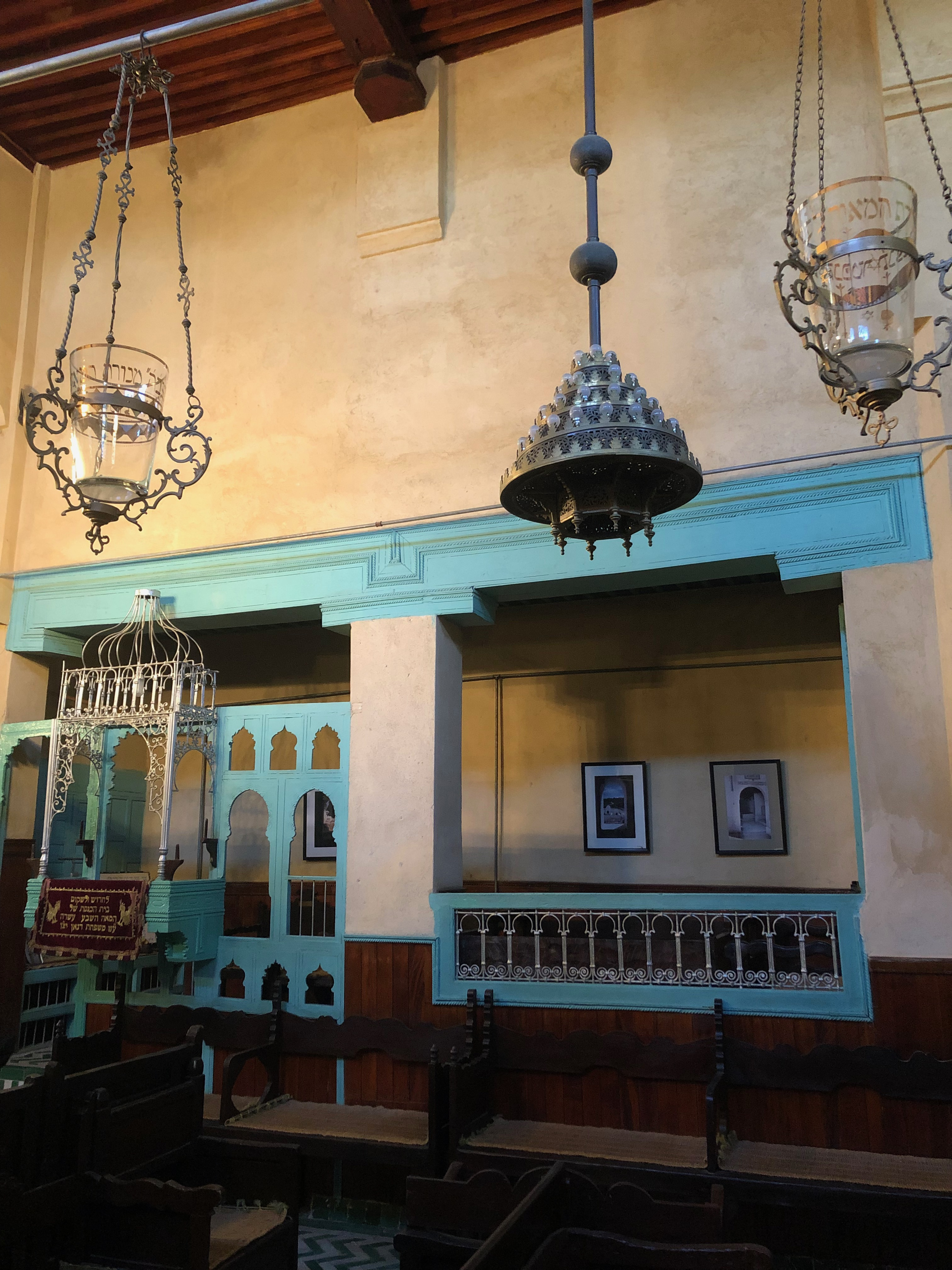
The Ibn Danan Synagogue in Fez

While many Spanish Jewish exiles to Morocco were able to successfully integrate into the larger community in part due to their relative wealth, the problem of poverty among exiles still left a significant number of Jewish refugees vulnerable. Many died of hunger and some returned to Spain; most fled to Fez, where new challenges awaited them. More than 20,000 Jews died in and around Fez following a terrible fire and subsequent famine in the Jewish quarter of the city.

Despite the trials faced by Jews in Morocco, numerous "New Christians" - also referred to as "Marranos" - that still remained in Spain and Portugal following the expulsions endeavored to make their way to North Africa. In response to this, King Manuel I issued a number of ordinances in 1499 forbidding the emigration of New Christians without explicit royal permission. Nevertheless, with monetary and transportive aid from figures already established in the Jewish diaspora, many New Christians succeeded in immigrating to North Africa.

A new group of New Christians came to Morocco through the establishment of the Inquisition in Portugal under Pope Paul III in 1536. In 1508, Portugal had come to occupy parts of Morocco, succeeding in conquering the old seaport town of Safi, which had a large number of Jewish inhabitants and had subsequently become an important commercial center. In 1510, Safi was besieged by a large Moorish army. Following this, some Portuguese Jews brought assistance to the besieged with ships manned by coreligionists and equipped at their own cost.

In Safi, the Jews were allowed to live as such by King Manuel I's permission; in addition to Asilah after 1533, which had long been a Portuguese possession. In the quarrels which took place afterwards between the Moors and the governors of Azamur, the Wattasid sultans employed some of the well-connected immigrants as commercial and diplomatic go-betweens with the Portuguese crown. Men such as Rabbi Abraham b. Zamiro of Safi, and Jacob Rosales and Jacob Rute of Fez, were as much agents of Portugal as Morocco. The Wattasids also took in their service some Jewish artisans and technicians who possessed strategic military skills. These men were employed in much the same spirit as Christian mercenaries, and were generally not considered to be government officials with any administrative authority over Muslims.

=== Under Saadi dynasty ===
The Saadi dynasty or Sa'di dynasty was a dynasty of Arab descent that ruled Morocco from 1554 to 1659.

From 1509 to 1554, the dynasty ruled over southern Morocco. In 1524, they established control over Marrakesh and made the city their capital. Their reign over the entirety of Morocco began with Sultan Mohammed ash-Sheikh in 1554, when he vanquished the last Wattasids at the Battle of Tadla. Saadian rule ended in 1659 with the end of the reign of Sultan Ahmad el Abbas.

In Marrakesh, a Sa'di ruler established a Mellah, or Jewish quarter, in the mid-16th century. In Arabic, mellah refers to a salty marsh area. The use of the word "mellah" for a Jewish quarter originates from the area of the first Moroccan Jewish quarter in Fez. In Marrakesh, the mellah was created in the area of the sultan's stables. Current scholars and Jewish oral tradition debate the exact year of the Marrakesh mellah's creation. According to the oral tradition of the Jews of Marrakesh, a Moroccan king created the mellah in 1557. Scholar Emily Gottreich argues, however, that the creation of the mellah of Marrakesh was not a singular event, but rather a process that took place over several years. Gottreich proposes that this process, referred to as mellahization, occurred between 1553 and 1562. In practice, the mellah of Marrakesh never served as an exclusively Jewish quarter. Non-Jews frequently traveled to and from the mellah and elite foreigners even stayed in the mellah during their visits to Marrakesh in the early years of the mellah. Gottreich argues that the Sa'di dynasty established the mellah of Marrakesh following the unification of northern and southern Morocco to legitimize their rule of Morocco through the creation of a lavish capital that mirrored Fez and included a defined space for dhimmi.

When, in 1578, the young king Sebastian with almost his whole army met death, and Portugal saw the end of her glory, in the Battle of Alcazarquivir, the few nobles who remained were taken captive and sold to the Jews in Fez and Morocco. The Jews received the Portuguese knights, their former countrymen, into their houses very hospitably and let many of them go free on the promise that they would send back their ransom from Portugal.

Samuel Pallache of the Sephardi Pallache family, having earned the confidence of Zaydan An-Nasser, had a significant role in Morocco–Netherlands relations, serving as the interpreter for his ambassador Hammu ben Bashir in a journey to the Dutch Republic, then again with Ahmad ben Abdallah al-Hayti al-Maruni, which led to the signing of the Dutch-Moroccan Treaty of Friendship and Free Commerce in 1611.

==== Megorashim and toshavim ====
As a result of events in Spain, such as the Pogroms of 1391, the Alhambra Decree of 1492, and the Spanish Inquisition, numerous Sephardic Jews—speakers of Spanish dialects: Ladino and Haketia—migrated from Iberia to Morocco, where they were referred to as the megorashim (מגורשים "exiles") or the rūmiyīn (روميين "Romans," i.e. "Europeans"), in contrast with the older autochthonous Amazigh and Arabized Jewish communities in Morocco, referred to as the toshavim (תושבים "residents") or the bildiyīn (بلديين "natives"). The Sephardic megorashim were officially welcomed by the Sultan Mohammed al-Shaykh, though they had difficulties settling in Morocco. Arriving with their wealth and unable to defend themselves in the new land, they were seen as easy targets for criminals, and suffered theft, rape, and violence.

With their skill in European commerce, arts, and handicrafts, hitherto largely unknown to the Moors, and with their wealth, the megorashim Jews contributed conspicuously to the rise and development of the Alaouite dynasty since its beginning in 1666. At first the Sa'dis appeared to be fanatical religious zealots who were intolerant of non-Muslims. They imposed heavy taxes on the local Jewish community. As they consolidated their authority in the country, however, they gradually evinced greater toleration toward the Jewish minority. Like their Wattasid predecessors, the Sa'di sultans now employed Jews as physicians, diplomatic emissaries, and interpreters. Beginning in 1603, Abraham bin Wach and later Judah Levi served as ministers of the treasury. Members of the Jewish aristocratic Cabessa and Palache families were recruited by the sultan's court as agents and negotiators with European merchants who entered the country. Whereas the authorities increasingly proved to be friendly toward the Jews, the same could hardly be said of the Muslim masses as well as local urban and rural chieftains and governors.

In 1641, Muhammad al-Haj of the Sanhaja Amazigh Dilā' Sufi order of the Middle Atlas occupied Fez. This time was particularly difficult for Fessi Jews. A Jewish chronicle of the time recounts that in 1646 synagogues were ordered to close and were subsequently desecrated, damaged, or destroyed. The city was not receptive to the Dilā' either, and for a brief period in 1651 they rebelled and invited Muhammad ibn Muhammad al-Sharif, one of the early Alaouite sultans, to take control of the city.

=== Under Moulay Rashid and Moulay Ismail ===
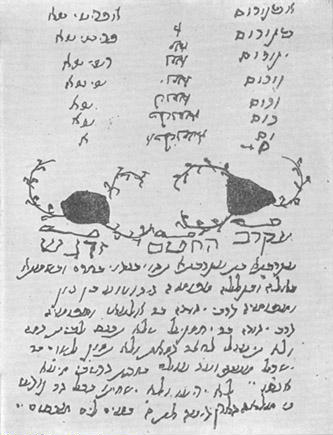
Kabbalistic charm against scorpions from Morocco

The Jews suffered much during the great conquests of Moulay Rashid, who united the separate parts of Morocco into one single state, and wished to add to it all northwest Africa. According to Louis de Chénier in 1787, when Al-Raschid took the city of Marrakesh in 1670, at the desire of the inhabitants he caused the Jewish counselor and governor of the ruling prince Abu Bakr, together with the latter and his whole family, to be publicly burned, in order to inspire terror among the Jews. He also tore down the synagogues of the city, expelled many Jews from the Berber region of Sus and treated them tyrannically. His demands on the Jews in the way of taxes were enormous; he had them collected by Joshua ben Hamoshet, a rich Jew, to whom he was under obligations for various services and whom he appointed chief over the Jews. He even ordered the Jews to supply wine to the Christian slaves.

In 1668 the Jewish community of Chaouya settled in Fez after Mulai Rashid attacked the town of Chaouya. They were given three days to leave and left with their rabbi Maimon Aflalo. They numbered around 1300 households and possessed great wealth. After they moved to Fez they were granted their own synagogue.

Moulay Rashid's successor was his brother Ismail (Moulay Ismail) (1672), one of the cruelest of tyrants. On his accession Ismail appointed his Jewish adviser Joseph Toledani, son of Daniel Toledani, Moulay Raschid's counselor, to be his minister, in which capacity Joseph concluded a peace between Morocco and Holland. Under Ismail's rule the ruined synagogues were rebuilt, although his taxes on Jews were oppressive. One day, he threatened to compel them to accept Islam if their Messiah did not come within a definite time. The Jews understood the hint and satisfied his pious zeal with a very large sum of money. The Jews, who served as tax-collectors on the whole coast, used to give Ismail a golden riding-outfit as an annual "present"—an inducement to keep them in office—and a hen and a dozen chickens fashioned in gold as a tax payment for the whole Jewish community. Ismail had another way of securing money: for a certain sum he would sell to an aspirant for honors the position and wealth of one of his favorites. In one such transaction Maimaran, who was chief ruler over the Jews of the realm, feared a rival in Moses ibn 'Attar, and offered the sultan a certain sum for his head. Ismail then let Moses ibn 'Attar know how much had been offered for his head, whereupon Ibn 'Attar offered double the sum for the head of his opponent. The sultan took the money from both, called them fools, and reconciled them to each other, whereupon Ibn 'Attar married a daughter of Maimaran and shared with his father-in-law reign over the Jews. The same Moses ibn 'Attar was Moorish plenipotentiary in the making of a compact with Great Britain in 1721.

After 1700 Fez no longer attracted as many Jews as in the previous centuries, while others still continued to arrive, other retained residence in Fez, while spending their time elsewhere.

In 1703 a controversy happened between the Jews of Chaouya residing in Fez to the rest of the Jewish community. They demanded from their communal leaders that the governmental taxes will be assessed for them separately. Furthermore, they had a bad relations with the rest of the community, and tried to form separate agreements with the government. Those two events, did not passed on eventually.

The two communities, those who came from Spain (megorashim) and the locals, finally melded together. Arabic was the main language, while unique Spanish rituals were kept and practiced. The number of the community members fluctuated through the following years. There were times of relative peace and times of epidemics and different crises. For example, in 1723 an extended drought transformed the mellah into a ghost town as many Jews escaped and abandoned the area. "The houses of the rich are empty, their inhabitants have disappeared, the gates of the courtyards are closed, weeds grow and robbers enter, stealing the doors and the beds. Many houses have been demolished, their stones and rafters taken away.... Most of the streets of the mellah are deserted." Hunger took the lives of more than 2000 people and 1,000 more converted from Judaism.

=== In the 18th century ===
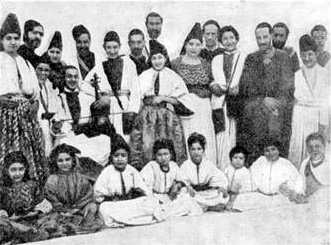
Jews of Fez, c. 1900.

The condition of the Jewish community was unchanged under Mohammed III (1757–89), who distinguished himself by his attempt to introduce European culture into his kingdom. The Jewish councilier Mohammed Ben Abdelah helped the United States between 1776 and 1783 through Intelligence operations coordinated by Luis de Unzaga 'le Conciliateur' and his brothers-in-law Antonio and Matías de Gálvez via Canary Islands and Louisiana. The Sultan's eldest son, Moulay Ali, governor of Fez, opposed his father's suggestion to impose a tax upon the Jewish community of Fez, concerned that they were unable to bear the present tax. He had a Jewish minister named Elijah ha-Levi, who had at one time fallen into disgrace and had been given as a slave to a smuggler of Tunis, but had been restored to favor. The accession to the throne of Yazid, after the death of Mohammed III in 1789, led to a terrible massacre of the Moroccan Jews, in part due to the Jewish community refusing to support him in his fight for succession with his brother. As a punishment the richer Jews of Tetouan, at his entry into the city, were tied to the tails of horses and dragged through the city. Many were killed in other ways or robbed, and Jewish women were raped. The Spanish consul, Solomon Hazzan, was executed for alleged treachery, and the Jews of Tangier, Asilah, and Alcazarquivir were condemned to pay a large sum of money. Elijah, the minister of the former king, who had always opposed Yazid in the council, quickly embraced Islam to avoid being persecuted, but died soon after. The persecution reached its climax in Fez, Rabat, and Meknes. In Mogador, tension grew between Jews and the city judge on the one hand, and the Moorish citizens on the other over Jewish clothing. Finally the Jews were ordered to pay 100,000 piasters and three shiploads of gunpowder; and most of them were arrested and beaten daily until the payment was made. Many fled beforehand to Gibraltar or other places; some died as martyrs; and some converted to Islam. The notables and the Muslim masses then rose to intervene on behalf of the Jews. They hid many of them in their houses and saved a great many others. In Rabat, the governor Bargash saved the community from the worst. The sanguinary events of the year 1790 have been poetically described in two kinot for the Ninth of Ab, by Jacob ben Joseph al-Mali? and by David ben Aaron ibn Husain.

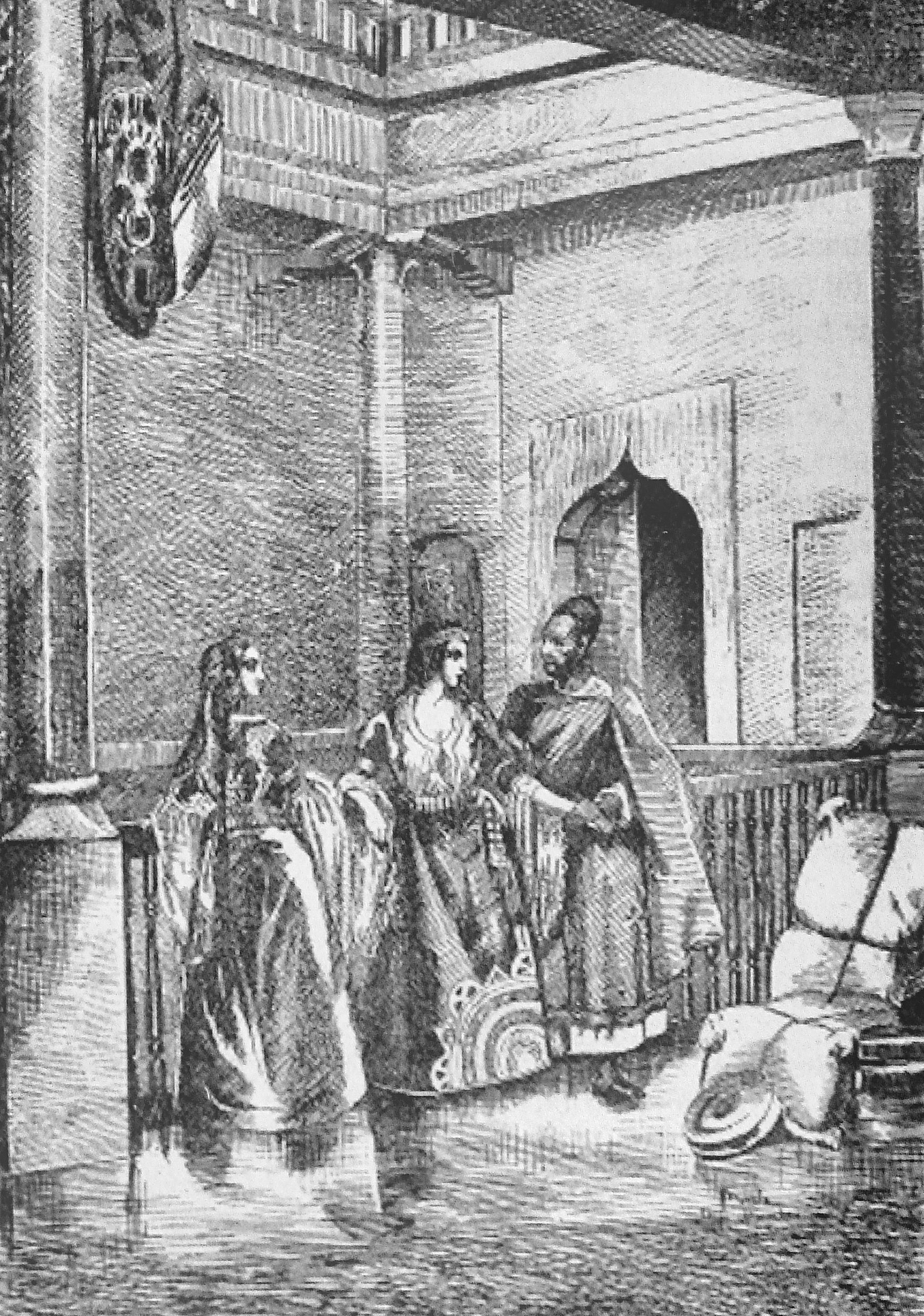
A Jewish house in Mogador, by Darondeau (1807–1841).

From the second half of the 18th century, there are various accounts of travels which give information concerning the external position of the Jews. In The Present State of Empire of Morocco Chénier describes the Jewish community:

The Jews possess neither lands nor gardens, nor can they enjoy their fruits in tranquillity. They must wear only black, and are obliged when they pass near mosques, or through streets in which there are sanctuaries, to walk barefoot. The lowest among the Moors imagines he has a right to ill-treat a Jew, nor dares the latter defend himself, because the Koran and the judge are always in favor of the Mohammedan. Notwithstanding this state of oppression, the Jews have many advantages over the Moors: they better understand the spirit of trade; they act as agents and brokers, and they profit by their own cunning and by the ignorance of the Moors. In their commercial bargains many of them buy up the commodities of the country to sell again. Some have European correspondents; others are mechanics, such as goldsmiths, tailors, gunsmiths, millers, and masons. More industrious and artful, and better informed than the Moors, the Jews are employed by the emperor in receiving the customs, in coining money, and in all affairs and intercourse which the monarch has with the European merchants, as well as in all his negotiations with the various European governments.

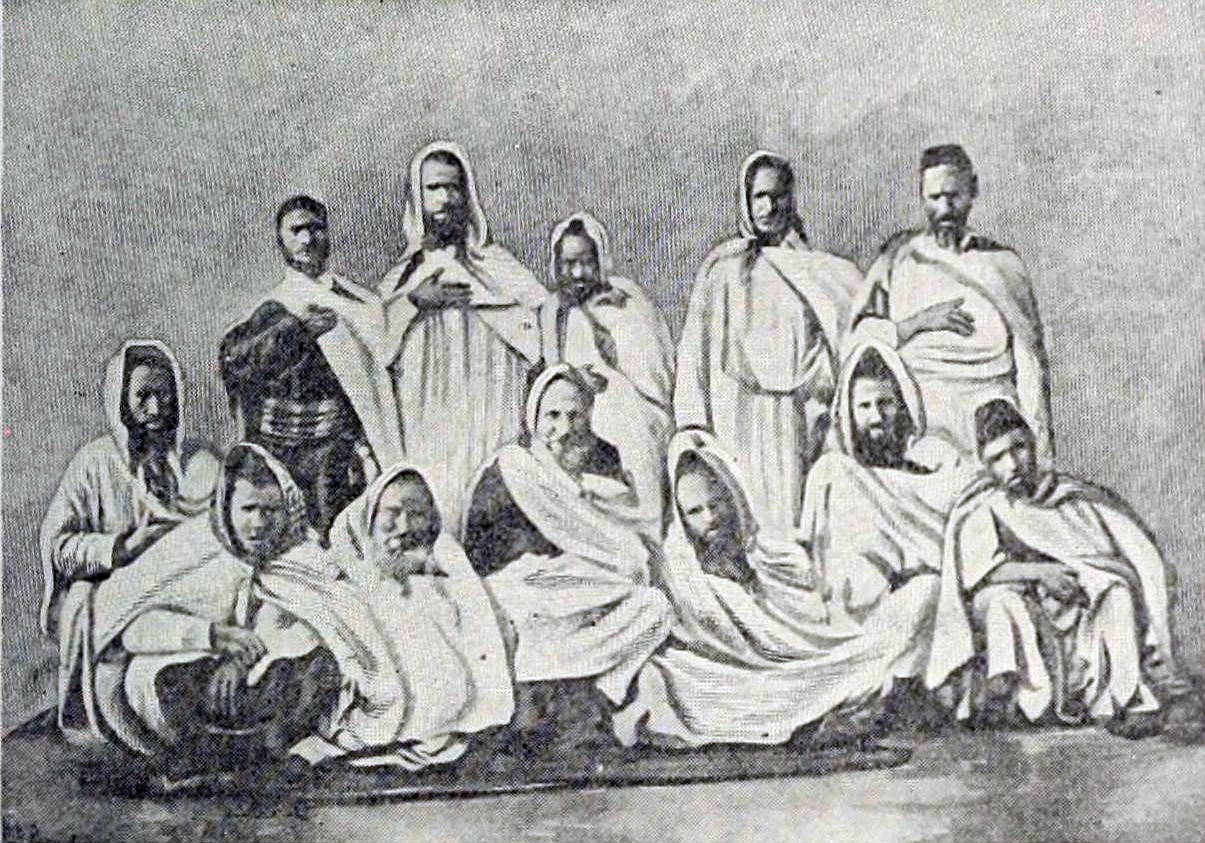
Berber Jews of the Atlas Mountains, c. 1900.

There were many Jewish officials, negotiators, treasurers, councilors, and administrators at the Moroccan court who the ruler used merely as intermediaries in extorting money and dismissed as soon as their usefulness in this direction was at an end. They were especially Jews from Spain, the megorashim, whose wealth, education, and statesmanship paved their way to the court here, as formerly in Spain. One of the first of such ministers was Shumel al-Barensi, at the beginning of the 16th century in Fez, who opened the "state career" to a long succession of coreligionists ending in the 19th century with Masado ben Leaho, prime minister and representative councilor of the emperor in foreign affairs. It would be erroneous to suppose that these Jewish dignitaries of the state succeeded in raising the position and the influence of their fellow believers, or that they even attempted to do so. They were usually very glad if they themselves were able to remain in office to the end of their lives.

Moroccan Jews were employed also as ambassadors to foreign courts. At the beginning of the 17th century Pacheco in the Netherlands; Shumel al-Farrashi at the same place in 1610; after 1675 Joseph Toledani, who, as stated above, concluded peace with Holland; his son Hayyim in England in 1750; a Jew in Denmark. In 1780 Jacob ben Abraham Benider was sent as minister from Morocco to King George III; in 1794 a Jew named Sumbal and in 1828 Meïr Cohen Macnin were sent as Moroccan ambassadors to the English court.

Another event that led to a population decrease among the community was the two-year exile of the Jews from the mellah in 1790–1792, during the brief reign of sultan Malawy yazid. The whole community was forced to go to Qasba Shrarda which was on the other side of Fez. After their departure, the mellah was radically transformed. A mosque was built on the site of the main synagogue. Under the order of yazid, tomb stones from a nearby Jewish cemetery were used to build the mosque, and the cemetery was moved to the entrance of the Muslim quarter along with the bones of the saintly rabbis. The exile lasted for two years. After the death of yazid, the qadi of Fez ordered the mosque to be torn down and the Jews were permitted to return to the mellah.

==== Oufrane ====
In the 18th century, in the period between the Saadi and 'Alawi dynasties, the Jewish community of Oufrane, which predated Islam in Morocco and spoke Tamazight and Arabic, came into contact with a "mad sorcerer" seeking the support of Yazid. Oral tradition tells how this "sorcerer," along with armed bandits who had been marauding through the Sous valley, forced a group of 60 Jews at a sūq to either convert or die. The local population was able to save ten of them, and the other fifty decided to all enter a fire rather than have any one of them convert. The site became revered as a holy place by both Jews and Muslims.

=== In the 19th century ===
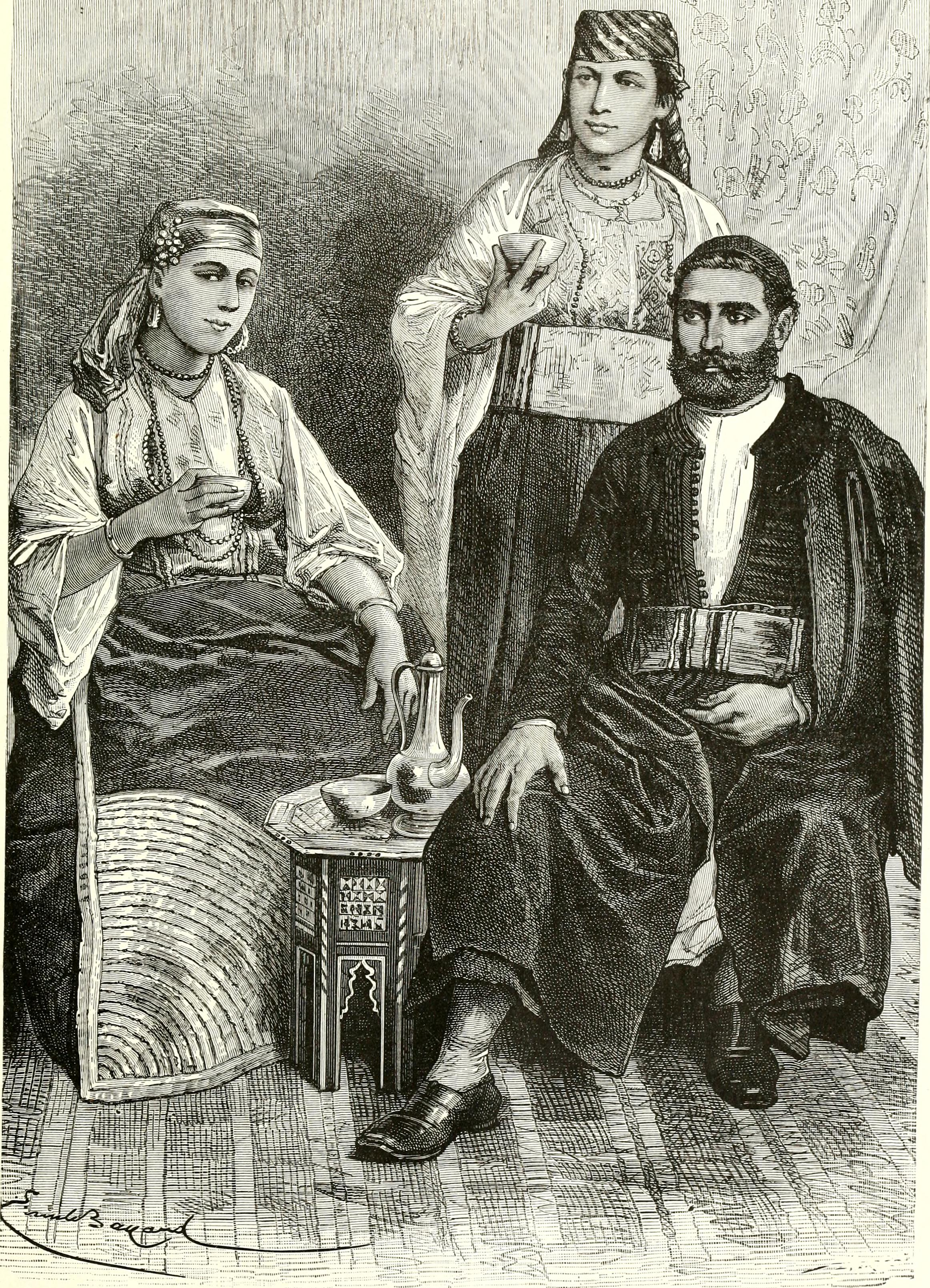
Sephardi Jews of Tangier in the late 19th century

In the mid 19th century, commercial development and European economic penetration brought prosperity to many Jewish merchants in northern Moroccan ports, but cost many Jews in the interior their traditional livelihoods, as industrial imports from Europe drove traditional Jewish crafts out of the market. As a result, Moroccan Jews started migrating from the interior to coastal cities such as Essaouira, Mazagan, Asfi, and later Casablanca for economic opportunity, participating in trade with Europeans and the development of those cities. Some impoverished migrants to overpopulated urban mellahs (Jewish quarters) struggled to survive as shopkeepers, peddlers, artisans or beggars.

Morocco's instability and divisions also fueled conflicts, for which Jews were frequent scapegoats. The First Franco-Moroccan War in 1844 brought new misery and ill treatment upon the Moroccan Jews, especially upon those of Mogador (known as Essaouira). When the Hispano-Moroccan War broke out on September 22, 1859, the Mellah of Tétouan was sacked, and many Jews fled to Cádiz and Gibraltar for refuge. Upon the 1860 Spanish seizure of Tetouan in the Hispano-Moroccan War, the pogrom-stricken Jewish community, who spoke archaic Spanish, welcomed the invading Spanish troops as liberators, and collaborated with the Spanish authorities as brokers and translators during the 27-month-long occupation of the city.

==== Alliance Israélite Universelle ====
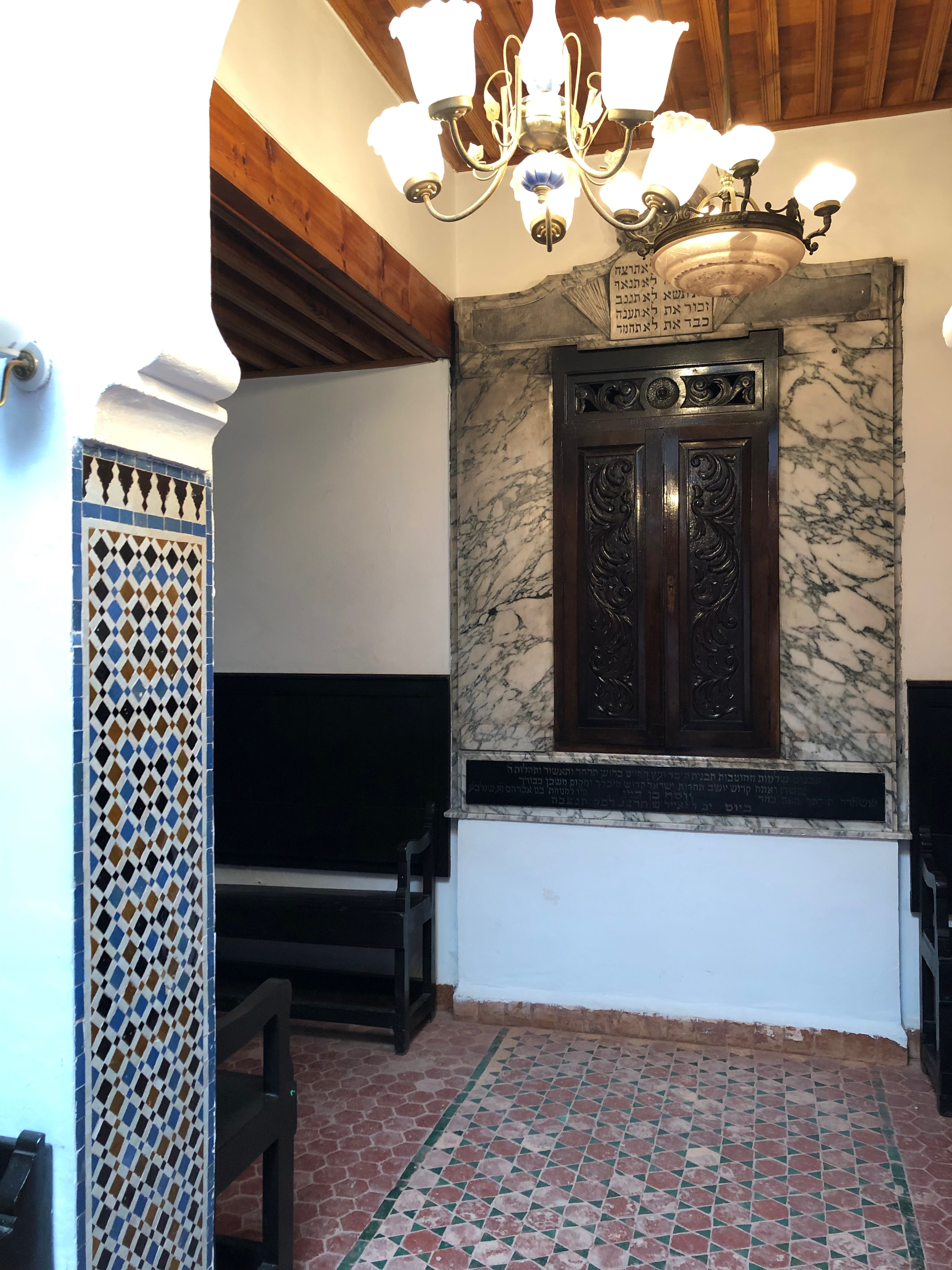
Isaac Ben Walid Synagogue, named after Isaac Ben Walid, rabbi of Tétouan, author, and founder of the first school of the AIU.

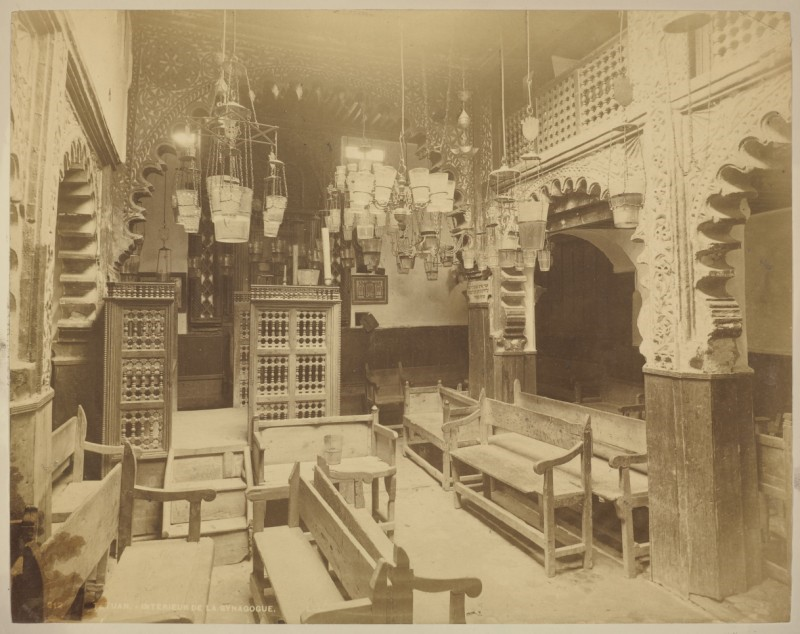
Interior of a synagogue in Tétouan, 1889

This incident in the Battle of Tétouan of 1860 was covered by the European Jewish press, which led to an international effort called "The Morocco Relief Fund." The persecution of Moroccan Jews was one of the motives for the foundation in 1860 of the Alliance Israélite Universelle (AIU), a French-based organization working for Jewish social and political equality and economic advancement worldwide.

The organization functioned as a Jewish missionary movement that sought to "modernize" the practices of North African Jews. Morocco was one of the countries where the AIU was most active; it opened its first school in Tétouan in 1862, followed by schools in Tangier (1864), Essaouira (1866), and Asfi (1867). Eventually, it had 83 schools in Morocco, more than in the rest of the world combined. Over time, the AIU in Morocco was more and more closely associated with French colonial influence; one of its assistant secretaries-general later noted that its "close, even organic relations with the Quai d'Orsay (French foreign ministry) were an open secret."

While the AIU failed to achieve much in increasing Moroccan Jews' political status, it did succeed in giving a significant minority of them modern French-language educations and in initiating them into French culture. This included a transformation of many Moroccan Jews' gender and sexual norms. For many centuries, Moroccan Jews and Muslims had shared such customs as polygamy, segregation of the sexes, early ages of female marriage, and a tolerance for men's love of male youths that was in contrast to both Jewish and Islamic scriptural prescriptions. The AIU set out to Europeanize Moroccan Jews' marriage patterns and family forms, combating prostitution, eliminating Jewish women's traditional head coverings, and reining-in on what it saw as Jewish men's promiscuity and homosexual tendencies. These changes required, in the words of an AIU alumni association in Tangiers in 1901, that Jewish mores be "disengaged from the Muslim spirit" – thus helping, like the AIU's activities generally, to increase Moroccan Jews' distance from an emerging Moroccan national identity. Abraham Levy-Cohen founded the first francophone newspaper in Morocco, Le Reveil du Maroc, in 1883 to spread French language and culture among his coreligionists. The increased spread and use of French by North African Jews led to the replacement of Judeo-Arabic languages in North Africa with French.

==== The Safi Affair and Montefiore's journey to Morocco ====
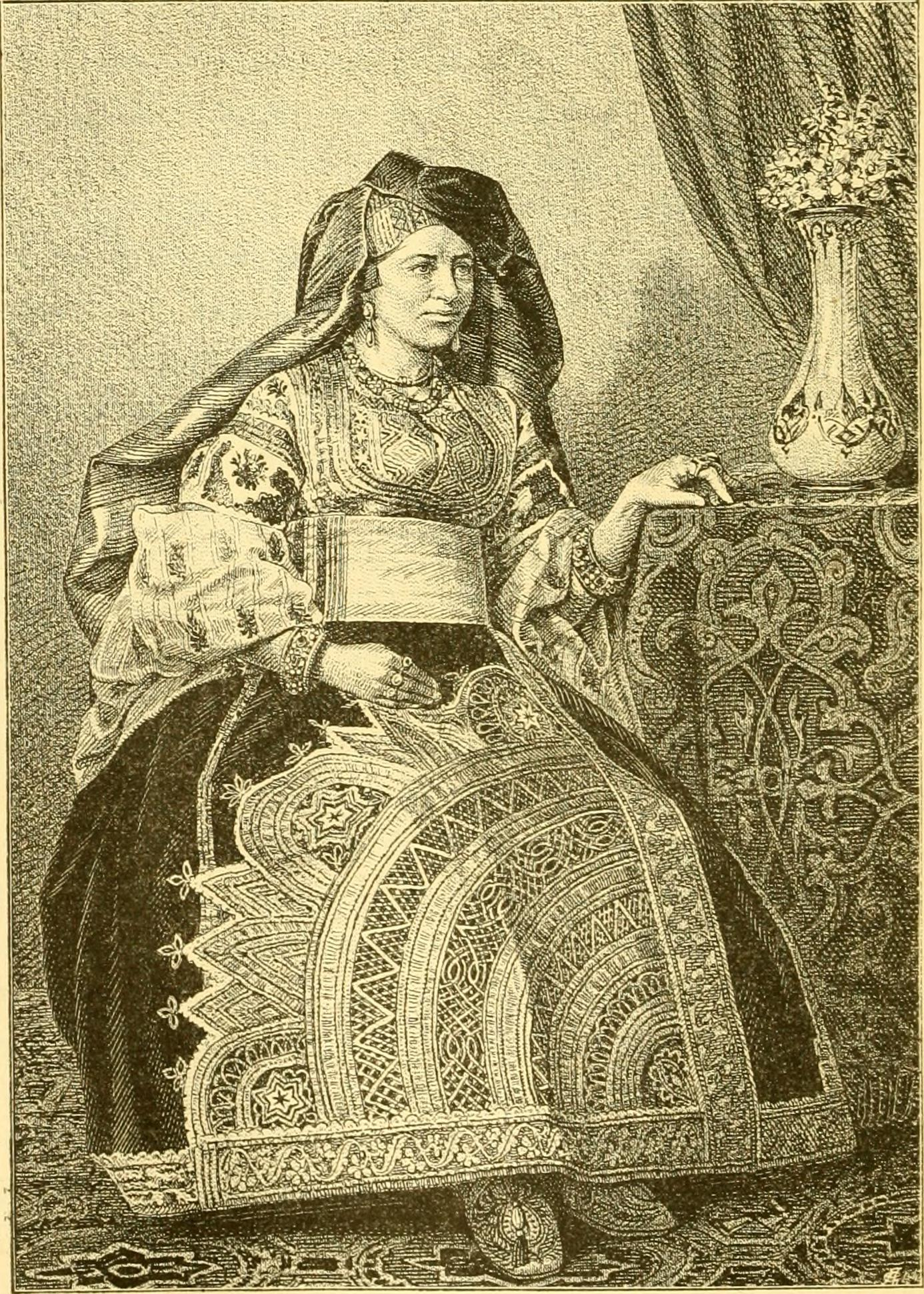
Moroccan Jewish woman wearing an ornate keswa-el-kbria, c. 1880

In the Safi Affair of 1863, two Jews in the city of Safi were accused of poisoning a retired Spanish colonel by the Spanish vice consul in conspiracy with other Jews. Both were both subsequently executed after confessions extracted by torture. Sir Moses Montefiore and the Board of Deputies of British Jews received a telegram from Morocco from Safi's Jews, who had appealed to the Makhzan, the local governor, without success, before turning to foreign Jewish organizations. Montefiore interceded on behalf of those imprisoned in relation to the accusation, and several other imprisoned Jews. Sir Moses, supported by the British government, undertook a journey to Morocco to demand the liberation of the imprisoned Jews and, as he said in a letter to the sultan, to move the latter "to give the most positive orders that Jews and Christians, dwelling in all parts of Your Majesty's dominions, shall be perfectly protected, and that no person shall molest them in any manner whatsoever in anything which concerns their safety and tranquillity; and that they may be placed in the enjoyment of the same advantages as all other subjects of Your Majesty." Montefiore was successful in both attempts, although he was unsuccessful in his goal of abolishing the Dhimmi status of Jews in Morocco.

The prisoners were liberated, and on February 15, 1864, the sultan published an edict granting equal rights of justice to the Jews. This edict of emancipation was confirmed by Mohammed IV's son and successor, Moulay Hasan I, on his accession to the throne 1873 and again on September 18, 1880, after the Conference of Madrid.

Pro-Jewish reforms were often not executed by local magistrates in the fragmented sultanate, however, and even if they were they reignited animosity toward the Jewish population. Thus, for example, the sultan Sulaiman (1795–1822) decreed that the Jews of Fez might wear shoes; but so many Jews were killed in the streets of that city as a result of the edict that they themselves asked the sultan to repeal it. According to a statistical report of the AIU, for the years 1864–80 no less than 307 Jews were murdered in the city and district of Morocco, which crimes, although brought to the attention of the magistracy upon every occasion, remained unpunished.

==== Migration to South America ====
During this century and up to 1910, around 1000 Moroccan Jewish families migrated to the Amazon, in northern Brazil, during the rubber boom.

==== Pictorial essay of Jewish community ====
Early photographs of Moroccan Jewish families, taken in the early 20th century by German explorer and photographer Hermann Burchardt, are now held at the Ethnological Museum of Berlin.

==== Conversion attempts ====
Jews in Morocco were targeted by the London Society to Promote Christianity Amongst the Jews, which sought to convert them to Christianity during the famine of 1877–1879.

=== 20th century ===
Organized Zionism, the 19th century European ethnocultural nationalist movement to establish a Jewish state through the colonization of Palestine, arrived in Morocco from Europe around 1900–1912 in the period just before Morocco's colonization. Zionist associations appeared in coastal cities in direct contact with Europe: Shivat-Zion ('Return to Zion') Association (Note: Judah Leon Jalfon, a rabbi in Tétouan, wrote to Theodor Herzl of the establishment of this society as early as 1900.) founded by Russian physician Dr. Ya'akov Barliawsky in Tétouan around 1900, Sha'are Zion in Mogador (now Essaouira), and Ahavat-Zion in Asfi. The Hibbat-Zion Society was established in Fez in 1908. The movement at this time was marginal, with interest limited to a faction of urban, secular Jews, merchants, and a few rabbis.

==== French Protectorate ====
Under French colonialism, Moroccan Jews had a different experience with the French mission civilisatrice than Moroccan Muslims, partly because Jews were more familiar to Europeans; there were not Muslim communities established in Europe at the time. Moroccan Jews came to embody their own newly consolidated and officially recognized subgroup in the mission civilisatrice.

European encroachment was not necessarily welcomed by Moroccan Jews. Emily Gottreich cites antisemitic "observations" in writings of the British journalist and adventurer Walter Burton Harris and the colonial priest Father Charles de Foucauld that were not exceptional of European Christian views at the time.

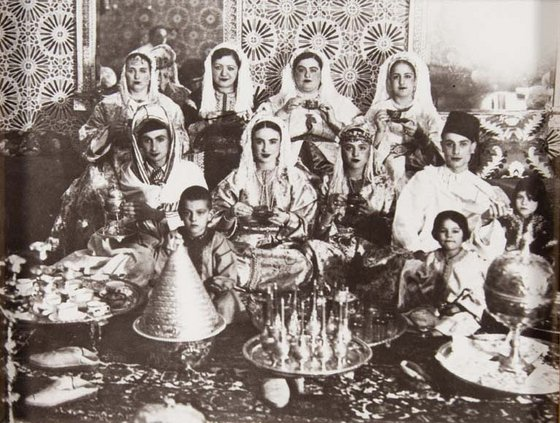
Tea ceremony (Maghrebi mint tea) at the Aflalo family’s home, Fez, 1930.

The status of Moroccan Jews was not substantially improved by the establishment in 1912 of a French protectorate over much of the country. By contrast with Algeria, where Jews obtained French citizenship en masse with the adoption of the Crémieux decree in 1870, the establishment of the French protectorate in Morocco cost many Jews the forms of European extraterritorial protection they had formerly enjoyed, relegating them once more to the status of indigènes or "natives" along with their Muslim compatriots.

In 1912, amid the insurrection that followed the disclosure of the Treaty of Fes, thousands of rebelling Moroccan soldiers entered and pillaged the Mellah of Fez, stopping only after French artillery rounds pounded the Jewish quarter. More than 50 Jews were killed and hundreds of homes and shops were destroyed or damaged. The events were known as Bloody Days of Fez or the "Tritel."

The Dahir of 1918 first organized the Jewish courts and established a legal organization for the Jewish communities in Morocco.

In Casablanca, the Hadida brothers edited Or Ha'Maarav, or La Lumiere du Maroc (1922–1924), a Zionist newspaper printed from 1922 until the French authorities shut it down in 1924, in two versions: one in Judeo-Arabic with Hebrew script and one in French. It was followed by L'Avenir Illustré (1926–1940) a pro-Zionist francophone newspaper, edited by a Polish Jew named Jonathan Thurz. To counter the Zionist press in Morocco, Moroccan Jews associated with the AIU established l'Union Marocaine (1932–1940), a francophone newspaper edited by Élie Nattaf. L'Avenir Illustré and L'Union Marocaine were both shut down by the Vichy regime.

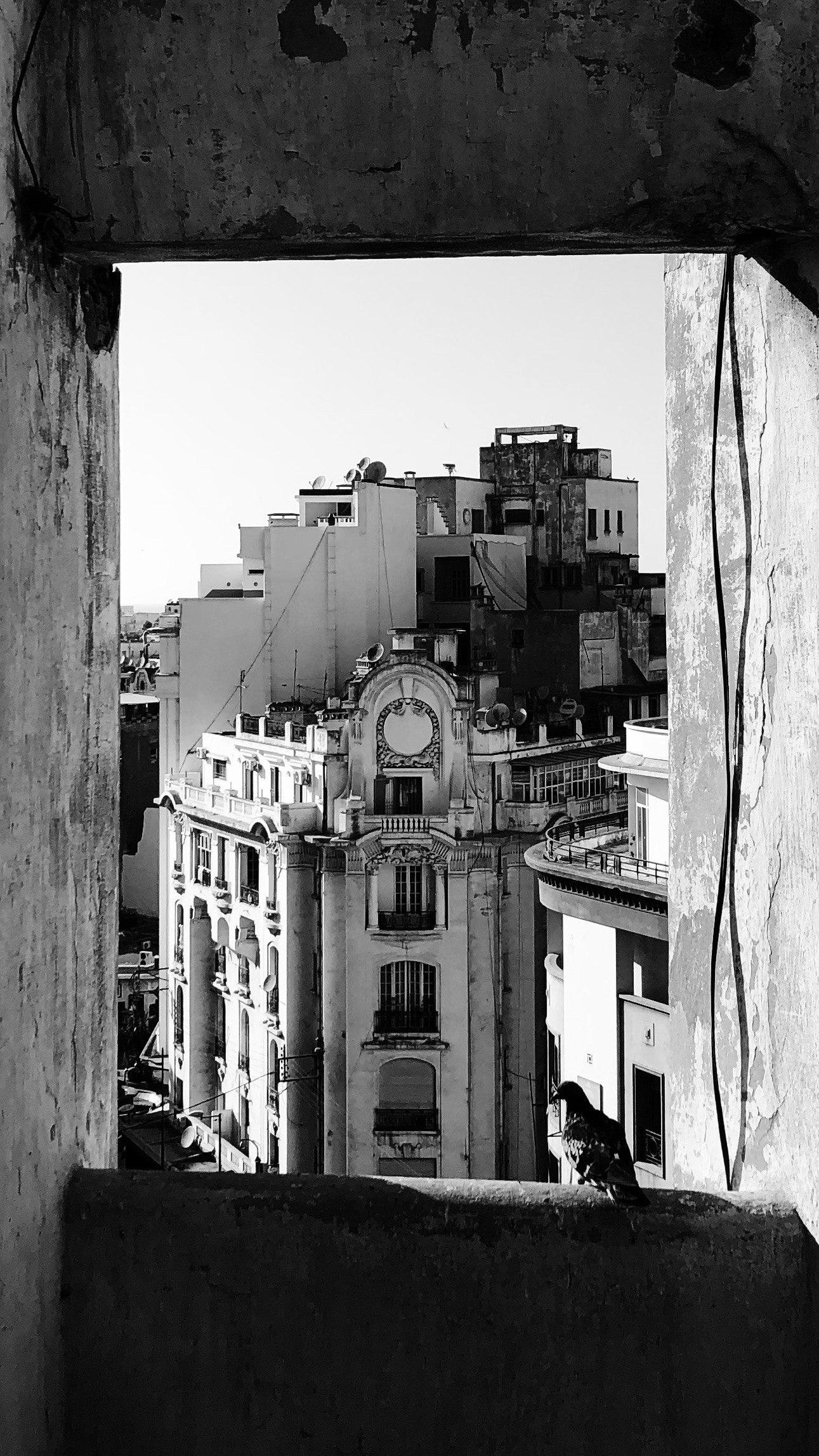
View from atop the Lévy-Bendayan Building in Casablanca. Jean-Louis Cohen highlights the role of Jewish patrons in the architecture and urban development of the city, particularly in constructing the overwhelming majority of the city's tallest buildings during the interwar period.

As a community, Moroccan Jews sent significant numbers of children to receive an education in French, at institutions such as the schools of the Alliance Israélite Universelle, a generation or two earlier than Moroccan Muslims. By the 1930s, however, increasing numbers of Moroccan Muslims had also started graduating from schools taught in French, demanding access to positions previously held by French citizens and by Moroccan Jews in French-owned businesses and in the colonial administration.

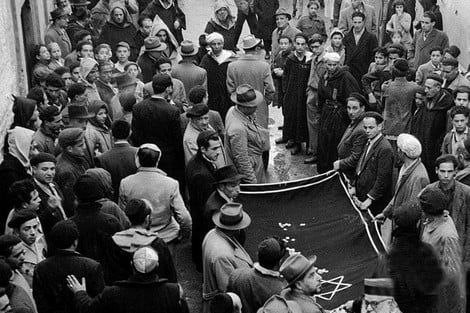
Moroccan Jews in 1941.

==== World War II ====
In 1940, Résident Général Charles Noguès implemented antisemitic decrees coming from Nazi-controlled Vichy government issued excluding Jews from public functions. Sultan Mohammed V reportedly refused to sign off on "Vichy's plan to ghettoize and deport Morocco's quarter of a million Jews to the killing factories of Europe," and, in an act of defiance, insisted on inviting all the rabbis of Morocco to the 1941 throne celebrations. However, the French government did impose some antisemitic laws against the sultan's will. Leon Sultan, of the Moroccan Communist Party, for example, was disbarred.

The racist laws had a negative effect on Moroccan Jews and put them in an uncomfortable position "between an indifferent Muslim majority and an anti-Semitic settler class." Some 7,700 Jews tried to flee to America or Israel, but were detained, and some were sent to Moroccan labour camps. The 1942 American landings in Operation Torch created hope that the Vichy laws would cease, but Noguès persuaded the Allies to allow them to continue.

With the American invasion and presence in Morocco, American Jewish organizations established themselves in Morocco, including the Joint Distribution Committee (JDC), Ozar Hatorah, and the Chabad-Lubavitch group, which opened religious schools in Morocco. Other major external Jewish and Zionist philanthropic organizations, including Œuvre de secours aux enfants (OSE), ORT, and others, implemented a massive aid program for children in the areas of nutrition, health, and education. A large majority of children benefited from this policy, infant mortality decreased, epidemics such as ringworm, trachoma, and tuberculosis declined dramatically, and a large number of children were enrolled in school. Small structures created by private initiatives, especially by the Zionist advocate Samuel-Daniel Levy and financially supported by the international organizations, have included Talmud Torah, Lubavitcher, Ozar Hatorah, Em Habanim, La Maternelle, Casablanca Children's Soup Kitchen, which have contributed to the effort.

The Dahir of 1918 was replaced by the Dahir of 1945, which democratized the internal political process of the Jewish communities. It called for yearly meetings of the leaders of the country's Jewish communities to discuss their common issues, and the Conseil des Communautés Israélites du Maroc was the organ through which those discussions took place.

==== 1948 Palestine War and the establishment of the State of Israel ====
After the 1948 Palestine War, approximately 250,000 Jews lived in Morocco. The 20,000 Moroccan Jews who had migrated to Israel in 1948-49 faced significant racism from Ashkenazi Jews and there was a demonstrated desire among the former to leave Israel and return to Morocco, particularly among the several hundred who had served in the Israeli military during the war.

===== Oujda riots =====
In June 1948, after the declaration of the State of Israel and in the midst of the 1948 Palestine war, riots against Jews broke out in Oujda and Jerada. The two towns, located near the border with Algeria, were departure points for Moroccan Jews seeking to reach Israel—at the time they were not permitted to do so from within Morocco—and "in the eyes of many Moroccans, they would join the ranks of enemy combatants against the Arab armies." In the events, 47 Jews and a French person were killed, many were injured, and property was damaged.

In 1948–9, 18,000 Jews left the country for Israel. After this, Jewish emigration continued (to Israel and elsewhere), but slowed to a few thousand a year. Through the early 1950s, Zionist organizations encouraged emigration, particularly in the poorer south of the country, seeing Moroccan Jews as a valuable source of labor for the Jewish State. From 1948 on many Jews left Fez. Most emigrated to Israel while others went to France and Canada. In the 1950s and 1960s there were still active Jewish schools and organizations such as the Alliance Israélite Universelle which later closed as the Jewish population decreased.

==== Cadima and Seleqseya ====
Cadima (Hebrew: קדימה) was the Zionist apparatus that oversaw the mass migration of Moroccan Jews to Israel from 1949 to 1956—about 90,000 in total, with a major escalation in the years preceding Moroccan independence. The apparatus was administered by Jewish Agency and Mossad Le'Aliyah agents sent from Israel, with assistance from local Moroccan Zionists. It was based out of an office in Casablanca and operated cells in large cities as well as a transit camp along the road to al-Jadida, from which Jewish migrants would depart for Israel via Marseille. From mid-1951 to 1953, Cadima applied the Seleqṣeya (Hebrew: הסלקציה), an Israeli policy that imposed criteria for immigration that discriminated against poor Moroccan Jews, families without a breadwinner in the age range of 18–45, and families with a member in need of medical care.

==== Moroccan independence ====
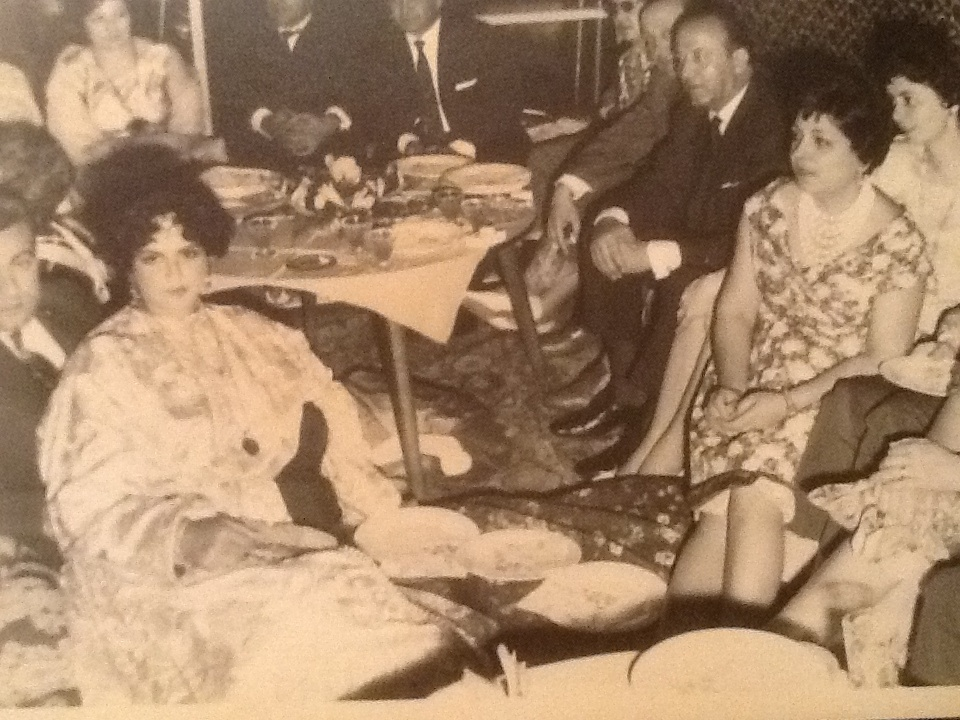
A fundraising party in Rabat by the Jewish Women Society of Morocco in the 1950's

There were Moroccan Jews who supported and aided the Moroccan nationalist movement in its struggle for independence. Rural pre-Sahran Jews provided support to the Army of Liberation of the South. Shay Hazkani sees the struggle of Moroccan Jews against the Ashkenazi racism in Israel that led to the Wadi Salib riots as an extension of the anti-colonial struggle they had been engaged in against France in Morocco.

However, on August 3, 1954, in the town of Petitjean, seven Jews were massacred. In July and August of 1955,

"Moroccan terrorists - directing their ire against the French after the exile of the Sultan Muhammad V to Madagascar... incited large-scale riots. In these riots, the Jews, like the Europeans, were not spared. Serious incidents took place in the mellah of Casablanca resulting in the injury of over 1000 Jews, and it was generally believed that a mass attack on the Jewish quarter of Casablanca would have taken place had it not been for the protection given by the French authorities.

Subsequently there were attacks, harassments and damage to property in the Jewish sections of Safi, Boujad, Ouezzan, and Mazagan.... The Jews [in Taroudant and Mazagan] were constantly pushed out of their professions and no longer welcome in the souks, where both Muslims and Jews had traditionally come to peddle their wares. Still, there were also places like Agadir, where the socio-economic situation of the Jews was relatively stable.

Nevertheless, on the whole the Jews felt that the Muslims would treat them well only so long as their services were needed, and consequently they were suspicious of the nationalist declarations of equal rights, fearing that instead there would be a full return to traditional dhimmi status.

For these reasons, as late as 1955 some Jews hoped the French would not go, even though under the French the Jews had achieved actually little more than the abolition of certain degrading measures."

Emigration to Israel significantly increased from 8,171 in 1954, to 24,994 in 1955, and increasing further in 1956. Between 1956 and 1961, emigration to Israel was prohibited, although it continued illegally.

When Mohammed V died, Jews joined Muslims in a national day of mourning. In 1956, when Morocco attained independence, Moroccan Jews were accorded citizenship on the same legal terms as Muslims. In the 44 years of the French Protectorate, only 1415 Moroccans had received a baccalaureate diploma, 640 of whom were Muslims and 775 of whom were Jews. Jews occupied several political positions, including three Members of the Parliament of Morocco and a Minister of Posts and Telegraphs. There was a short-lived movement within the Istiqlal Party to unite Muslims and Jews called al-Wifaq (الوفاق), with prominent Jewish figures such as Armand Asoulin, David Azoulay, Marc Sabbagh, Joe O'Hana, and Albert Aflalo.

In 1958, the liberal government of Abdallah Ibrahim of the Istiqlal led a new administration that joined the Arab League and became very involved. The government also intervened in economic affairs, especially to disengage the country from France economically, which may have disadvantaged Jewish business elites. It also effectively made the operation of Jewish organizations active in Morocco, including the Alliance Israélite Universelle, ORT, Hebrew Immigrant Aid Society, Joint Distribution Committee, Lubavitcher, and others, subject to state approval, requiring them to apply by registering their statutes with state authorities. It also tightened regulations forbidding Jewish emigration, including the establishment of a section of the police dedicated to emigration in 1959 that arrested numerous Jews suspected of planning to migrate to Israel. There were also bold Anti-Zionist rhetoric from political parties and the press that distinguished less and less between Zionism, Israel, and local Jews. It also suspended all postal contact with Israel.

===== Operation Mural and Operation Yachin =====
In the summer of 1961, David Littman organized the clandestine migration of 530 Moroccan children to Israel with the help of the Œuvre de secours aux enfants (OSE) in Operation Mural, an operation led by the Mossad.

In 1961, with the coronation of Hassan II, the government relaxed the laws on emigration to Israel and even facilitated it. From 1961 to 1964, almost 90,000 Moroccan Jews were migrated to Israel in Operation Yachin, an Israeli-led initiative in which the Hebrew Immigrant Aid Society paid King Hassan II a sum per capita for each Moroccan Jew who migrated to Israel. Over the next three years, more than 80,000 Moroccan Jews emigrated to Israel. By 1967, only 60,000 Jews remained in Morocco.

The Six-Day War in 1967 led to increased Arab-Jewish tensions worldwide including in Morocco. By 1971, its Jewish population was down to 35,000; however, most of this new wave of emigration went to Europe and North America rather than Israel. France for a time was a destination particularly for Moroccan Jews with European educations, who had economic opportunities there; one study of Moroccan Jewish brothers, one of whom settled in France and the other in Israel, showed that 28 percent of the brothers who settled in France became managers, businessmen or professionals (compared to 13 percent of their Israeli brothers) and only 4 percent unskilled workers (compared to over a third of their Israeli brothers). Moroccan Jews in Israel, far more numerous, enjoyed less upward mobility: 51 percent were blue-collar in 1961 and 54 percent as late as 1981.

King Hassan II's pleas to former Moroccan Jews to return have largely been ignored.

=== 21st century ===
Despite their current small numbers, Jews continue to play a notable role in Morocco. The King retains a Jewish senior adviser, André Azoulay. They are well represented in business and even a small number in politics and culture. Jewish schools and synagogues receive government subsidies. Several Jewish museums throughout the country cater to the growing interest in preserving Moroccan Jewish heritage and history. However, Jews were targeted in the Casablanca bombings of May 2003.

In 2004, Marrakesh had an aging population of about 260 Jews, most over the age of 60, while Casablanca had between 3,000 and 4,000 Jews. A 2014 figure says there are about 2,500 Jews still living in Morocco. As of 2019, the total number of Jews in Morocco was 2,100. By 2025, the Jewish Population in Morocco had decreased to 1,000. In 2019, the State of Israel was home to 472,800 Jews of Moroccan descent, around 5% of the nation's total population.

In 2013, it was revealed that there is a rapidly growing trend of Moroccan-Jewish families sending their sons to study at the Jerusalem College of Technology in Israel. Most of these students opt to take up Israeli citizenship and settle in Israel after graduating. Conversely, a small trickle of criminals from Israel have been settling in Morocco, exploiting the lack of an extradition treaty between the two nations. However, most of these are not of Moroccan descent. There are still many Jewish citizens in Morocco who choose to raise their children in the Jewish faith, and most of those children are sent to the Alliance Israélite Universelle school. However, the majority of students at this school pursue higher education in other countries and leave Morocco.

Morocco formally normalized relations with Israel with the Abraham Accords. In late 2021, marking the first anniversary of the re-establishment of diplomatic ties between Morocco and Israel, King Mohammed VI launched an initiative to restore hundreds of historical Jewish sites throughout the country. The plan envisions the renovation of hundreds of synagogues, cemeteries and other Jewish heritage sites in a number of Moroccan cities, including the Jewish cemetery in Fez, which counts thousands of graves. It was also reported that the king had decided that the original names of a few of the country's Jewish neighborhoods were to be reinstated. The initiative was lauded by Israel and the European Jewish Congress.

In November 2022, Morocco opened the first university synagogue of the Arab world at the Mohammed VI Polytechnic University in Marrakesh. The project was led by the Mimouna Association and the American Sephardi Federation. It was inaugurated by Rabbi Elie Abadie.

In May 2025, the last Jewish resident of Essaouira, Josef Sebag, died.

== Gallery ==
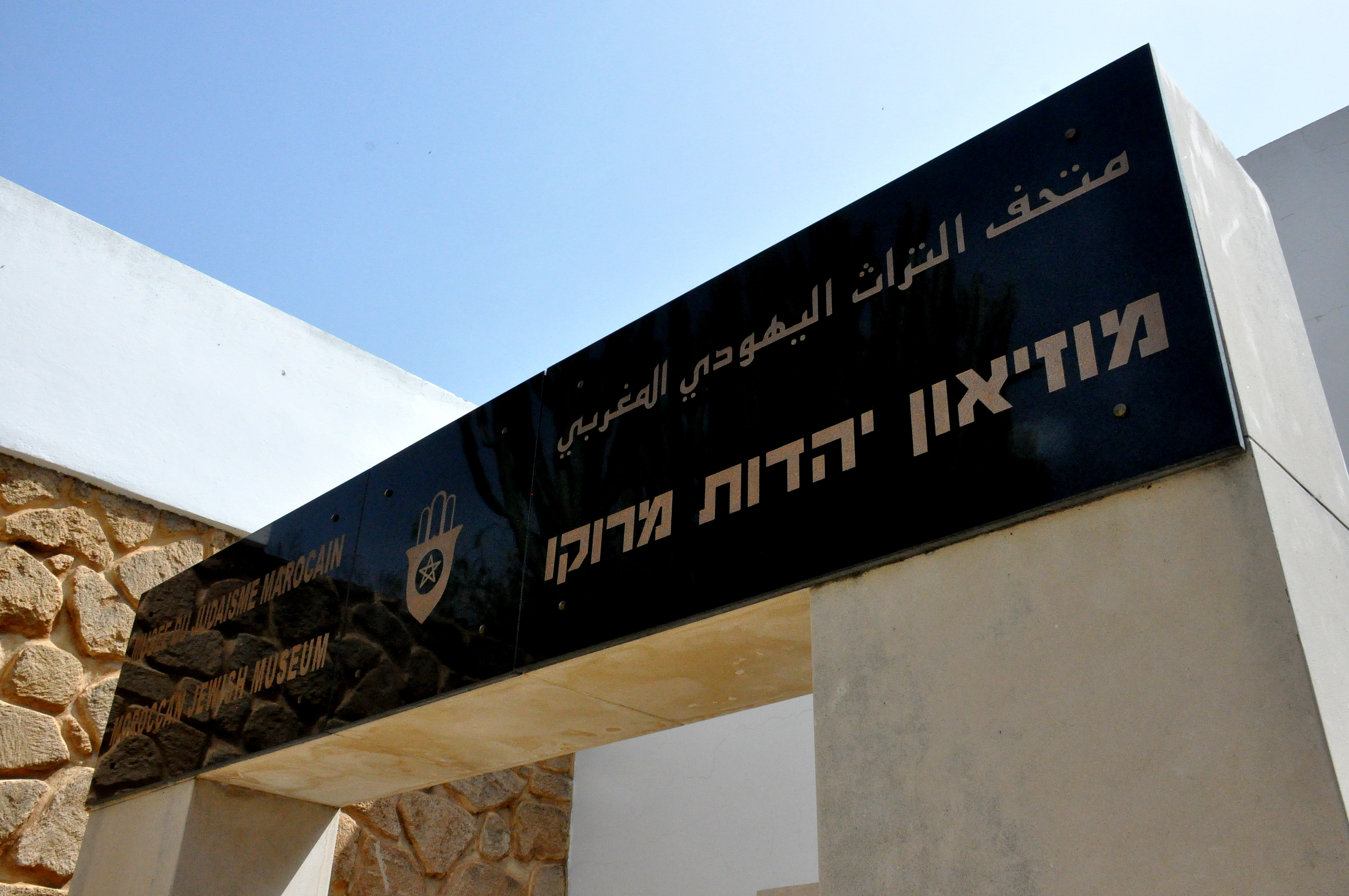
Moroccan Jewish Museum, Casablanca Morocco

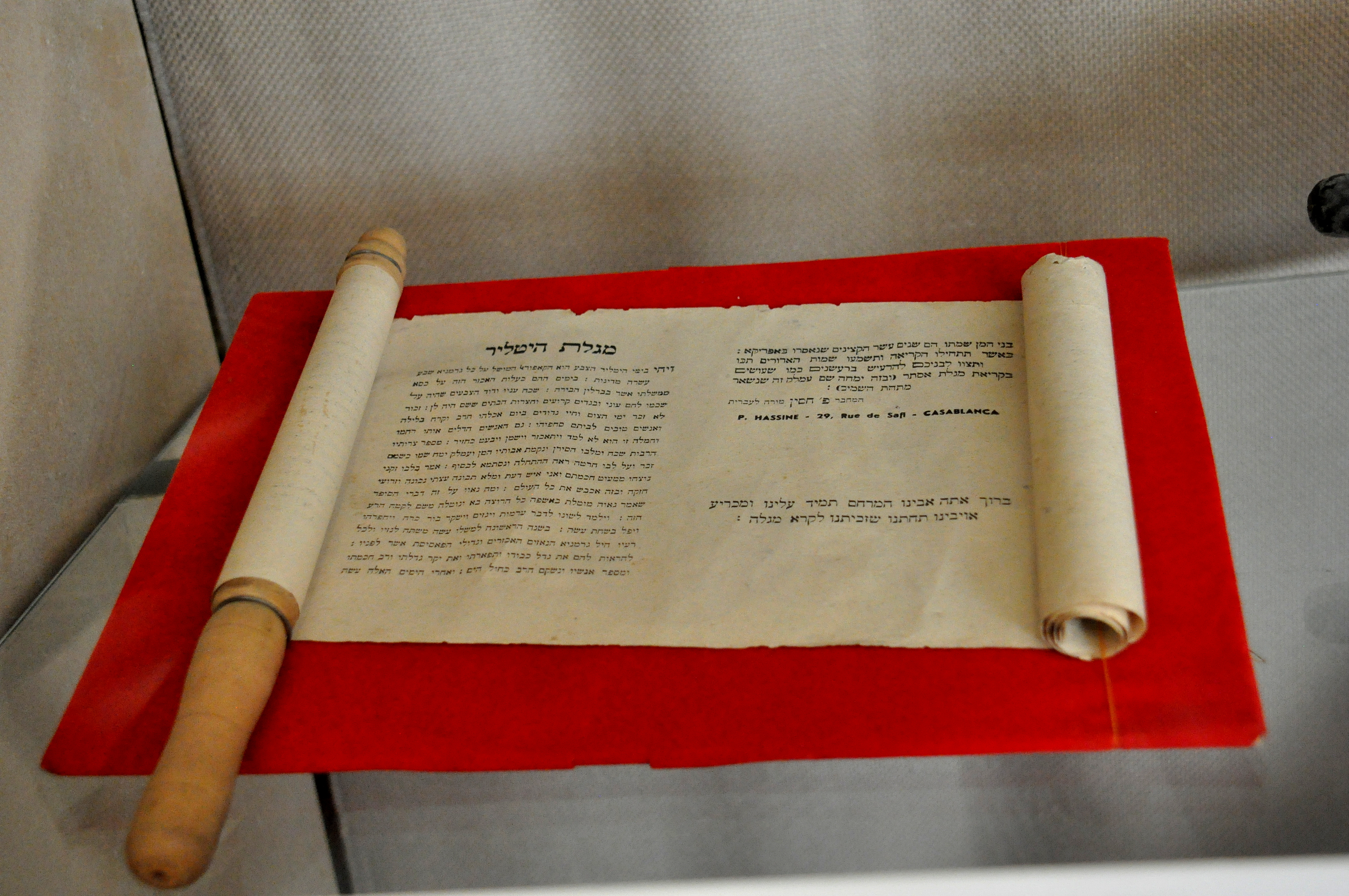
Megillah, Megillat-Hitler parody megillah, Moroccan Jewish Museum, Casablanca

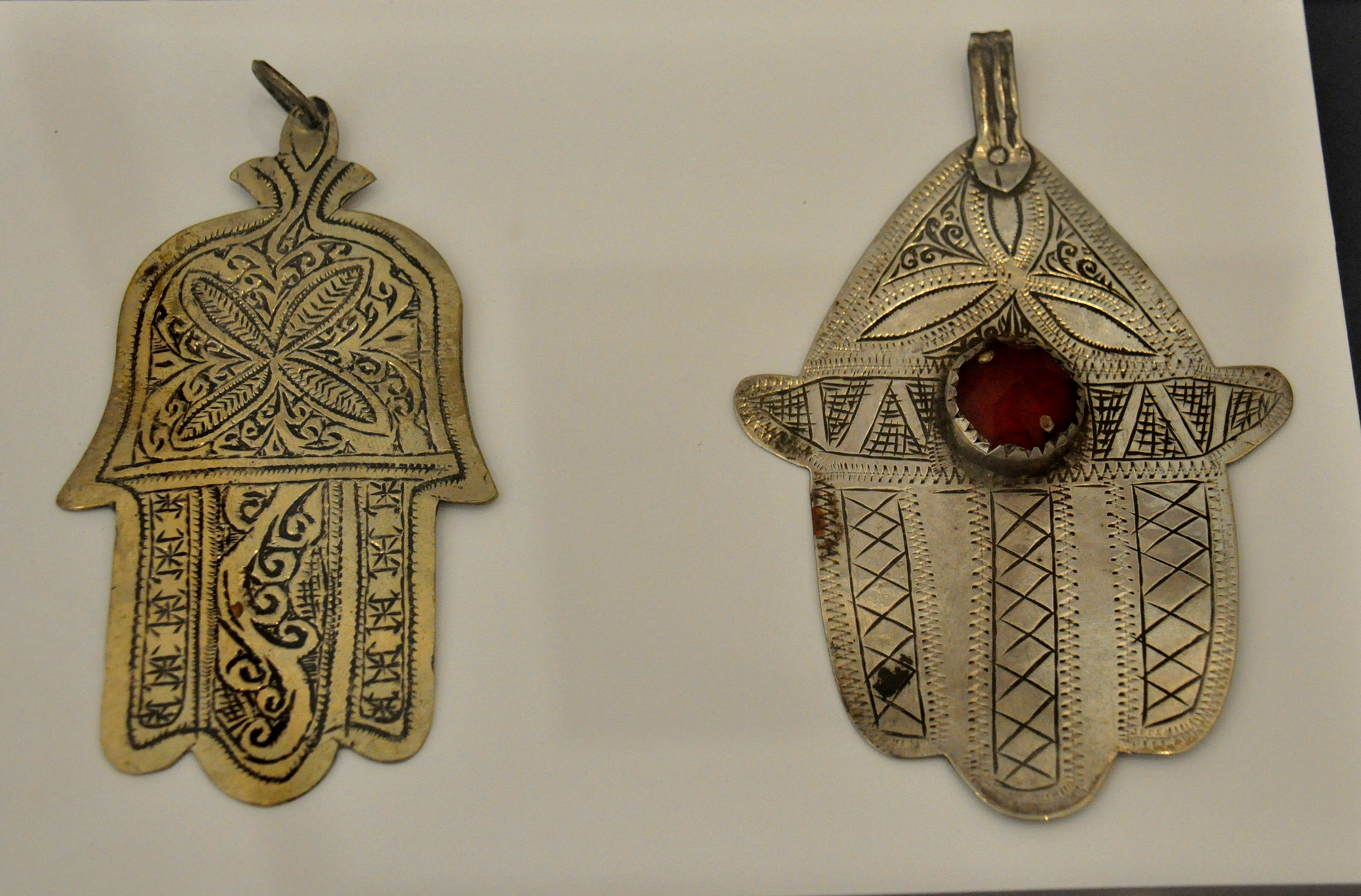
Jewelry, once belonged to a Jewish family. Moroccan Jewish Museum, Casablanca

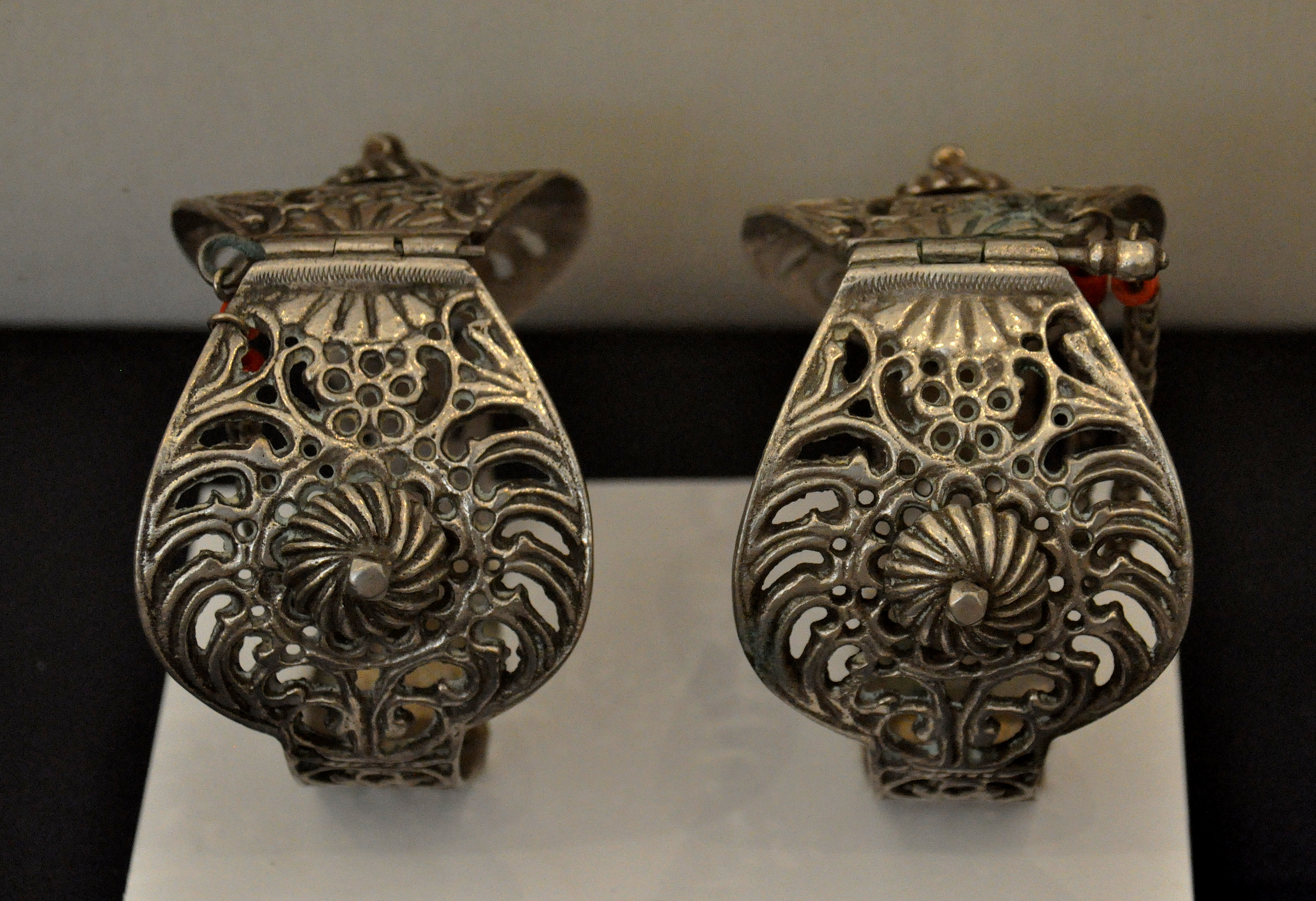
Pair of anklets, silver molded, city style. Once belonged to a Jewish woman. Moroccan Jewish Museum, Casablanca

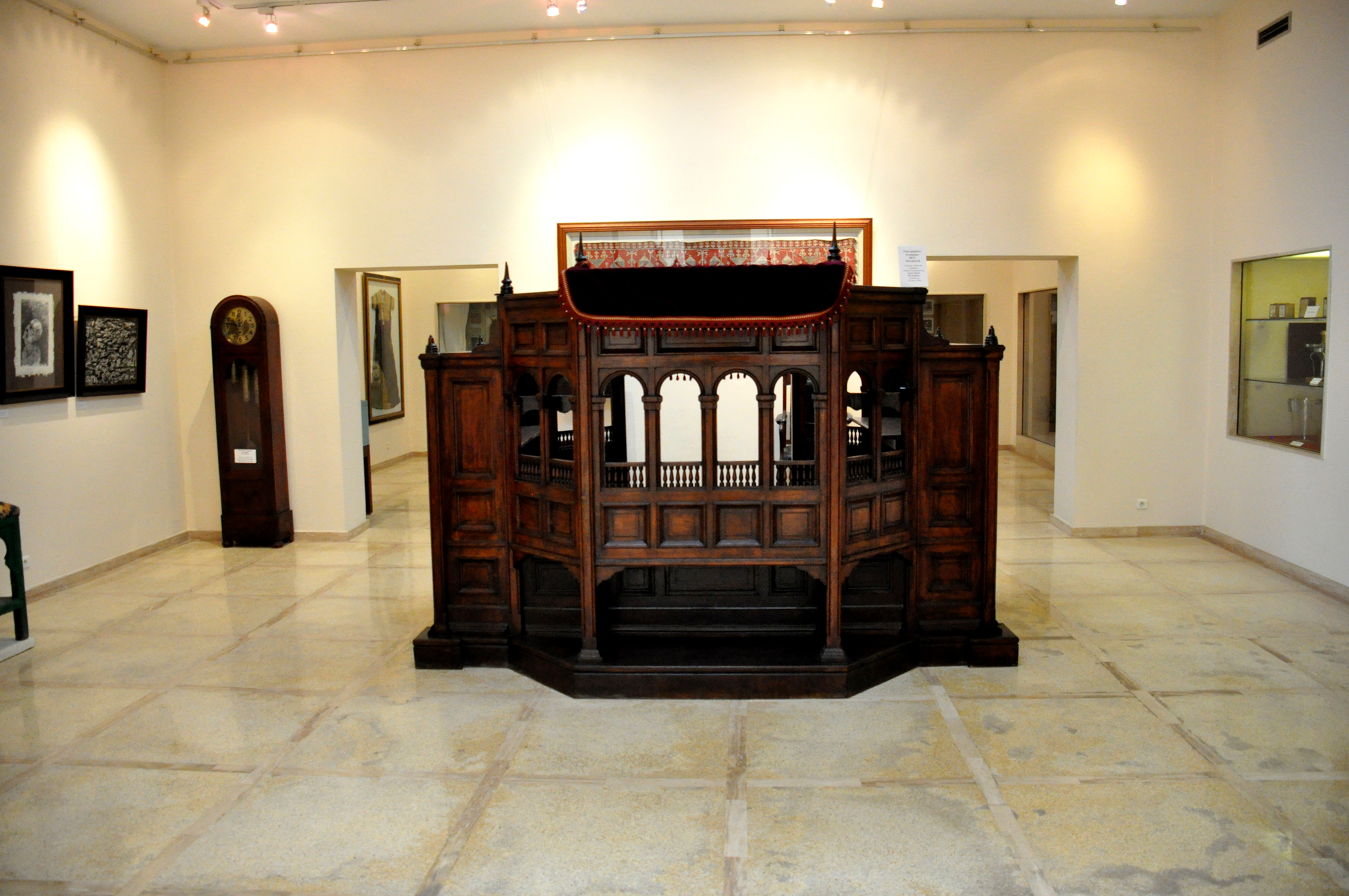
One of the halls at the Moroccan Jewish Museum, Casablanca

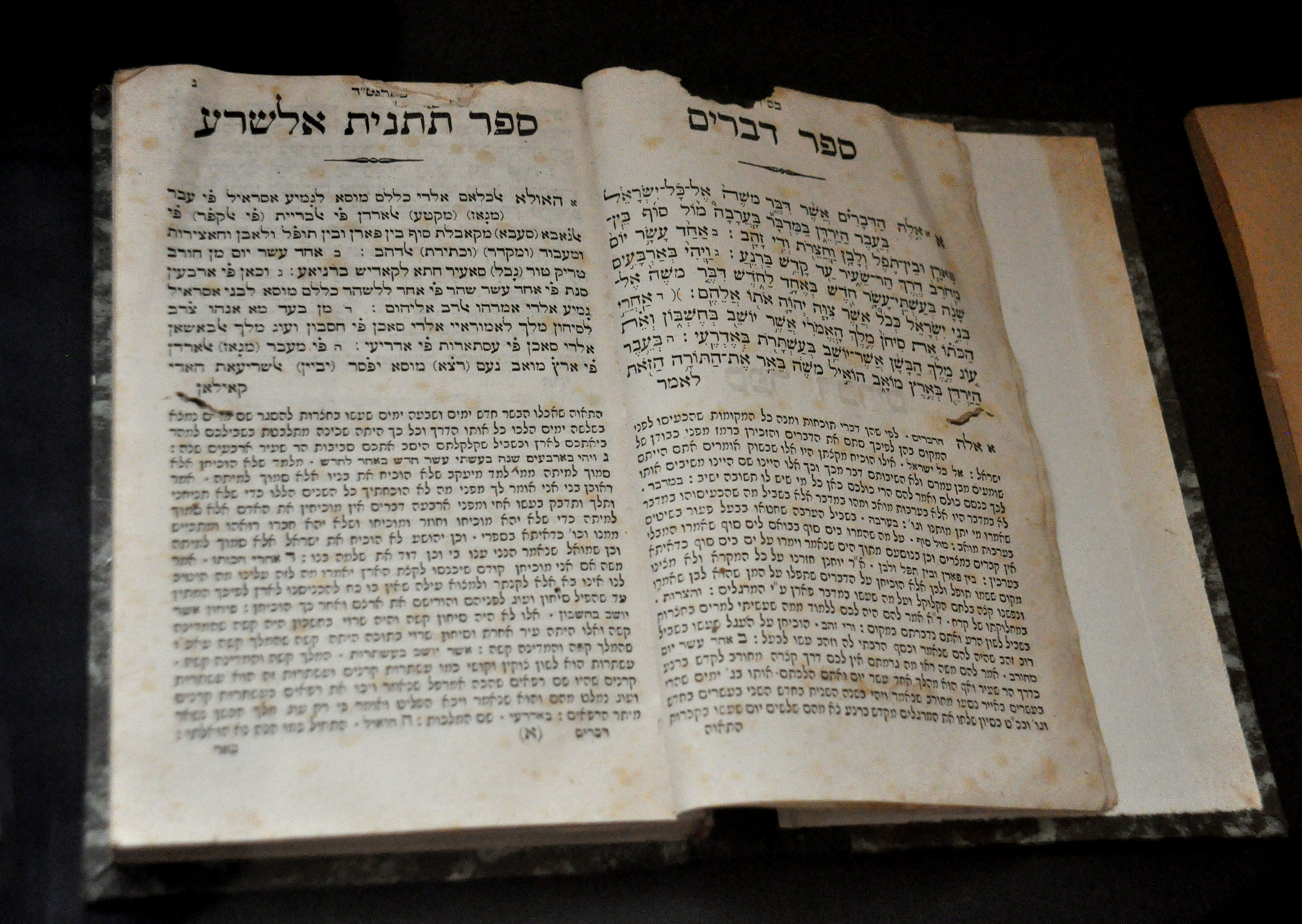
The Book of Deuteronomy, Debarim. Hebrew with translation into Judeo-Arabic, transcribed in Hebrew letters. From Livorno, 1894 CE. Moroccan Jewish Museum, Casablanca

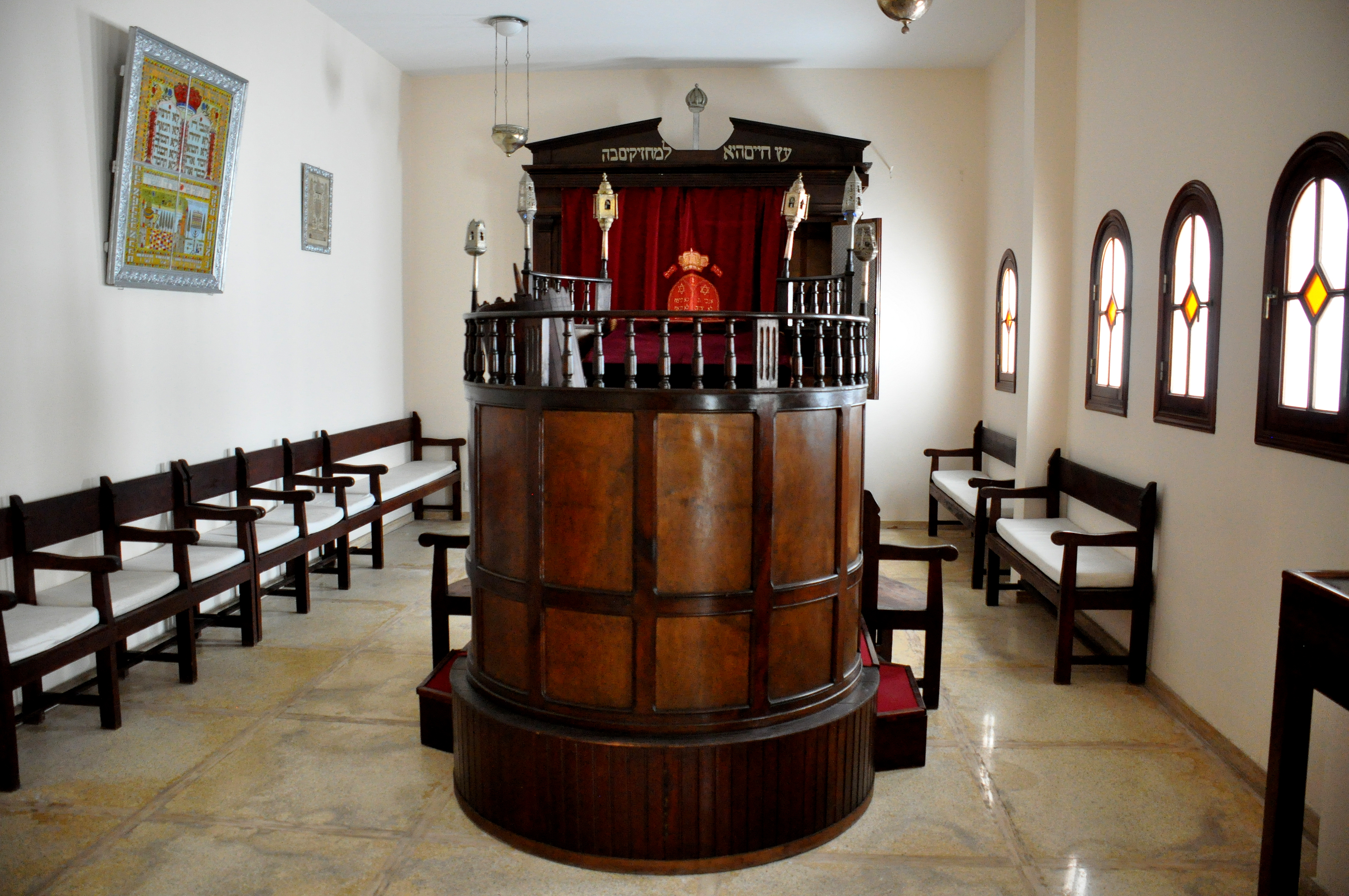
One of the halls at the Moroccan Jewish Museum, Casablanca, Morocco

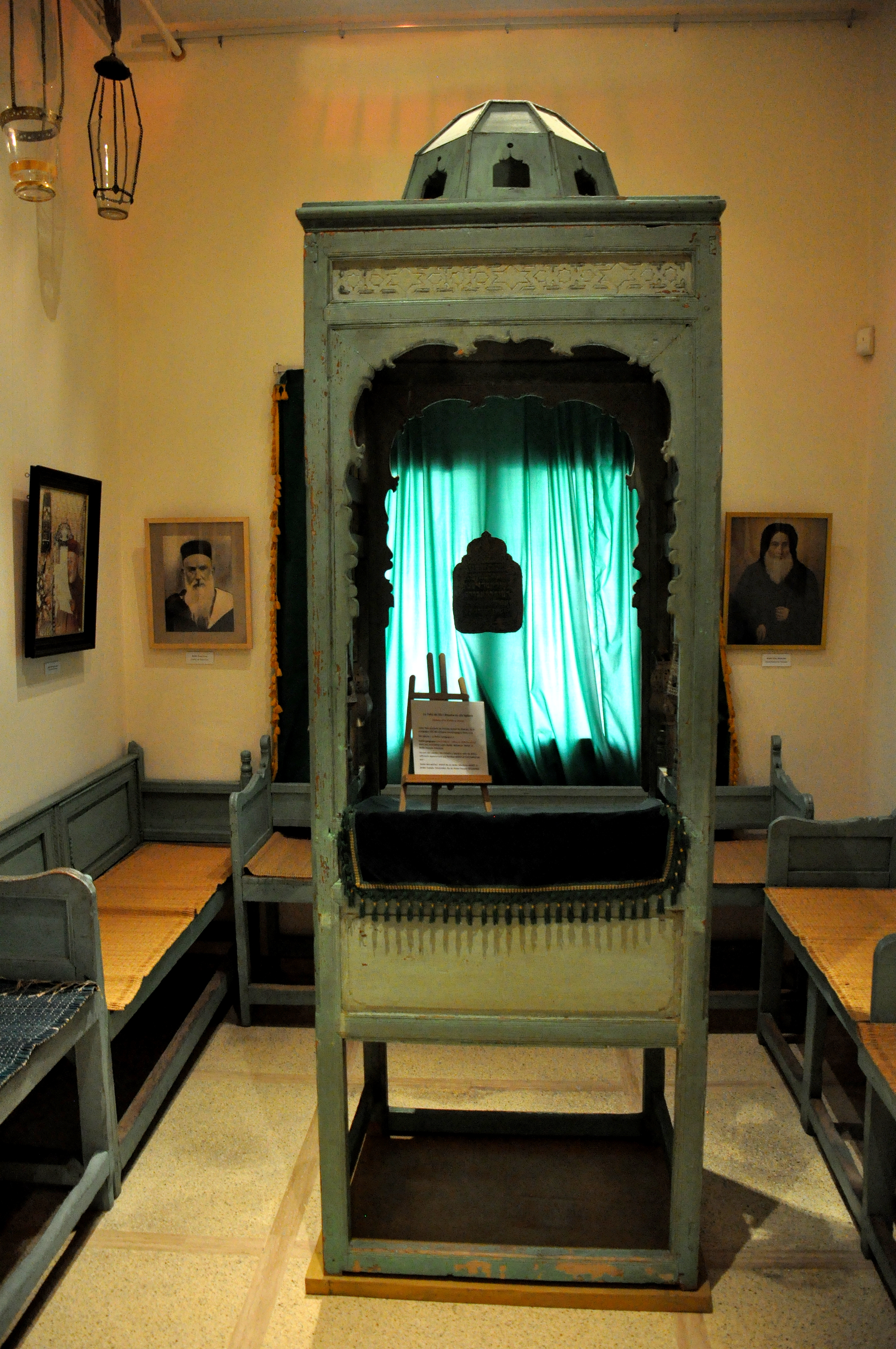
One of the halls at the Moroccan Jewish Museum of Casablanca, Morocco

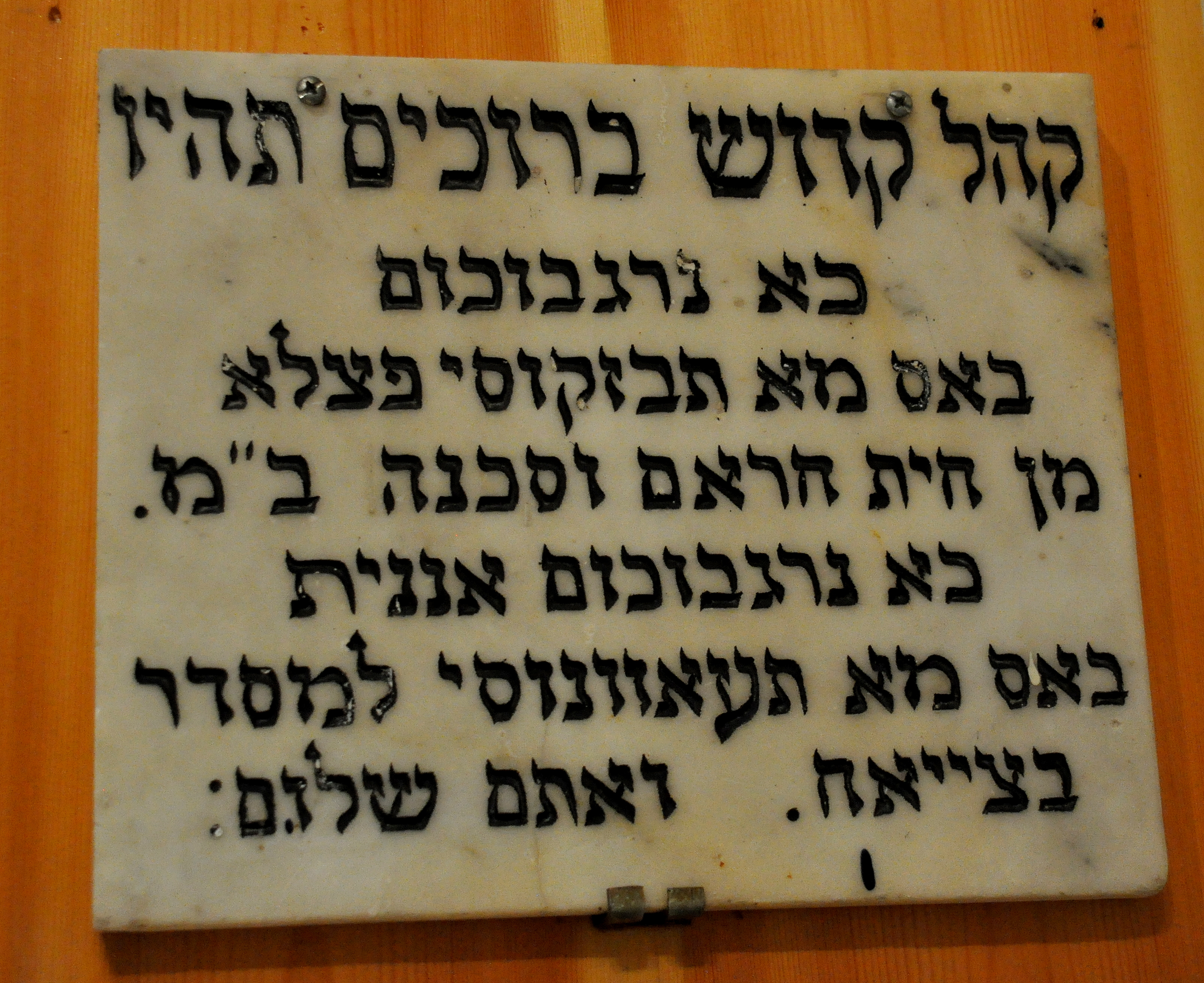
A wall sign advising attendants of a Jewish synagogue on what to do during prayer. Moroccan Jewish Museum, Morocco

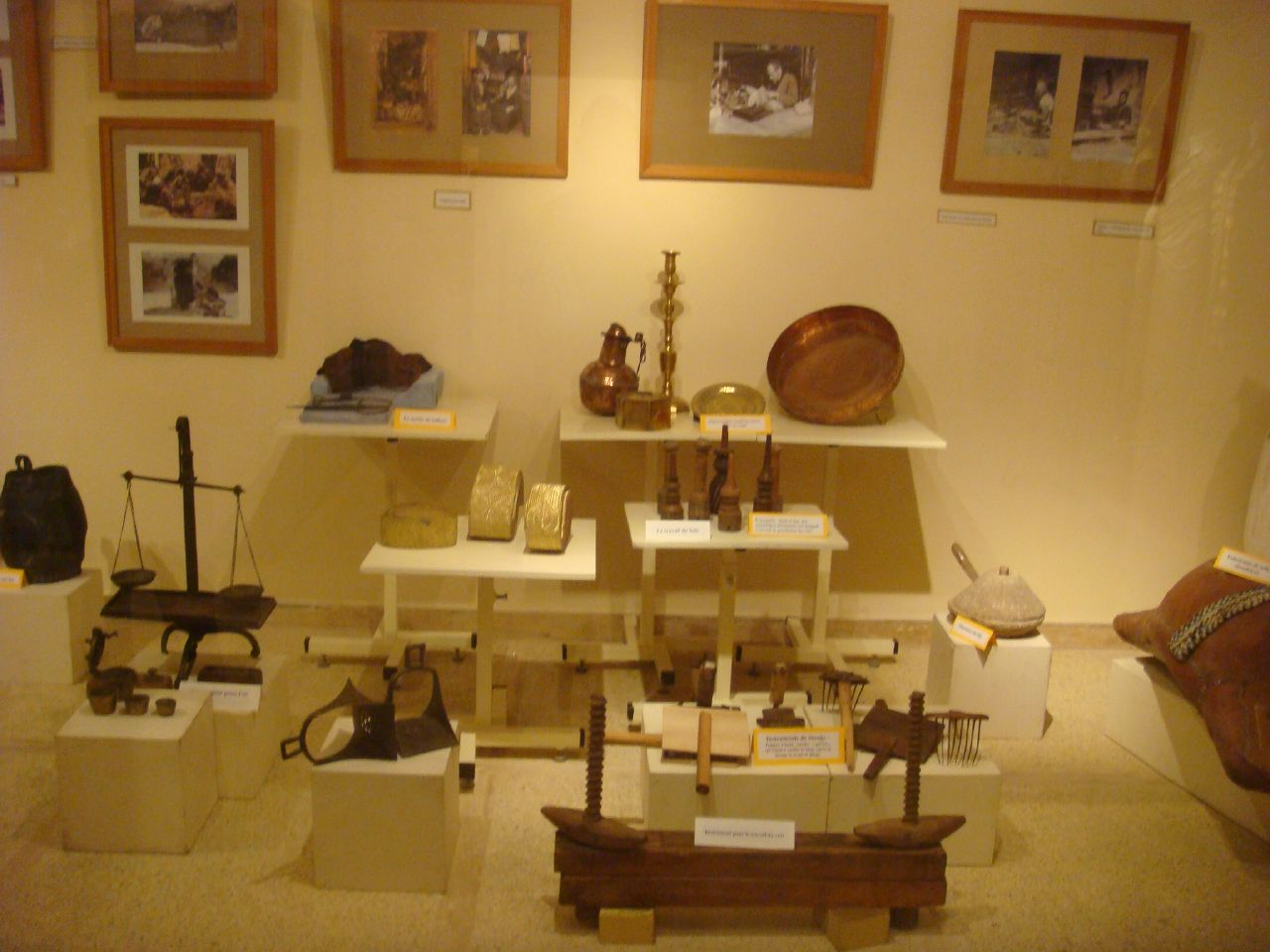
Moroccan Jewish Museum in Casablanca

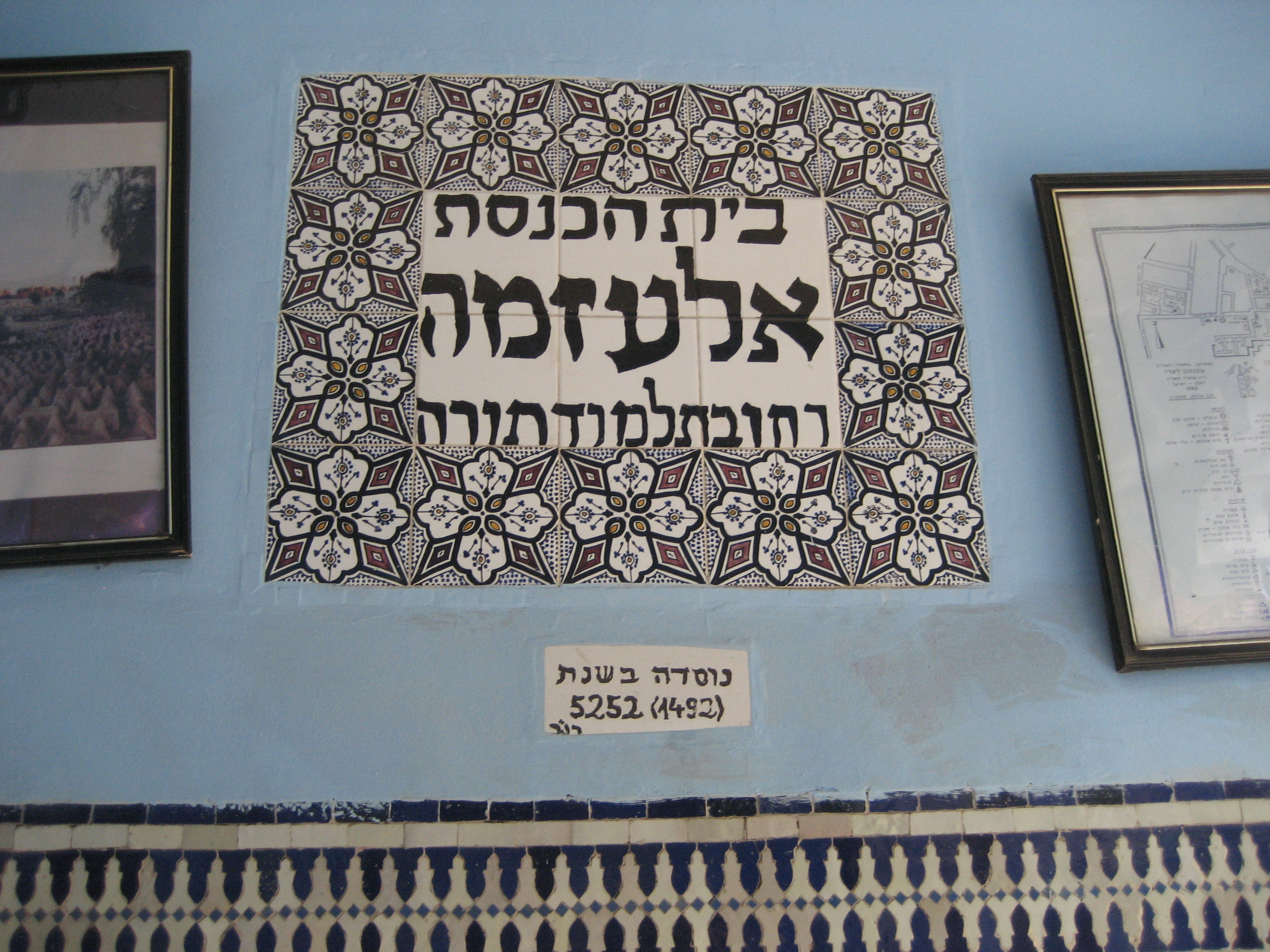
Entrance of the Marrakesh synagogue

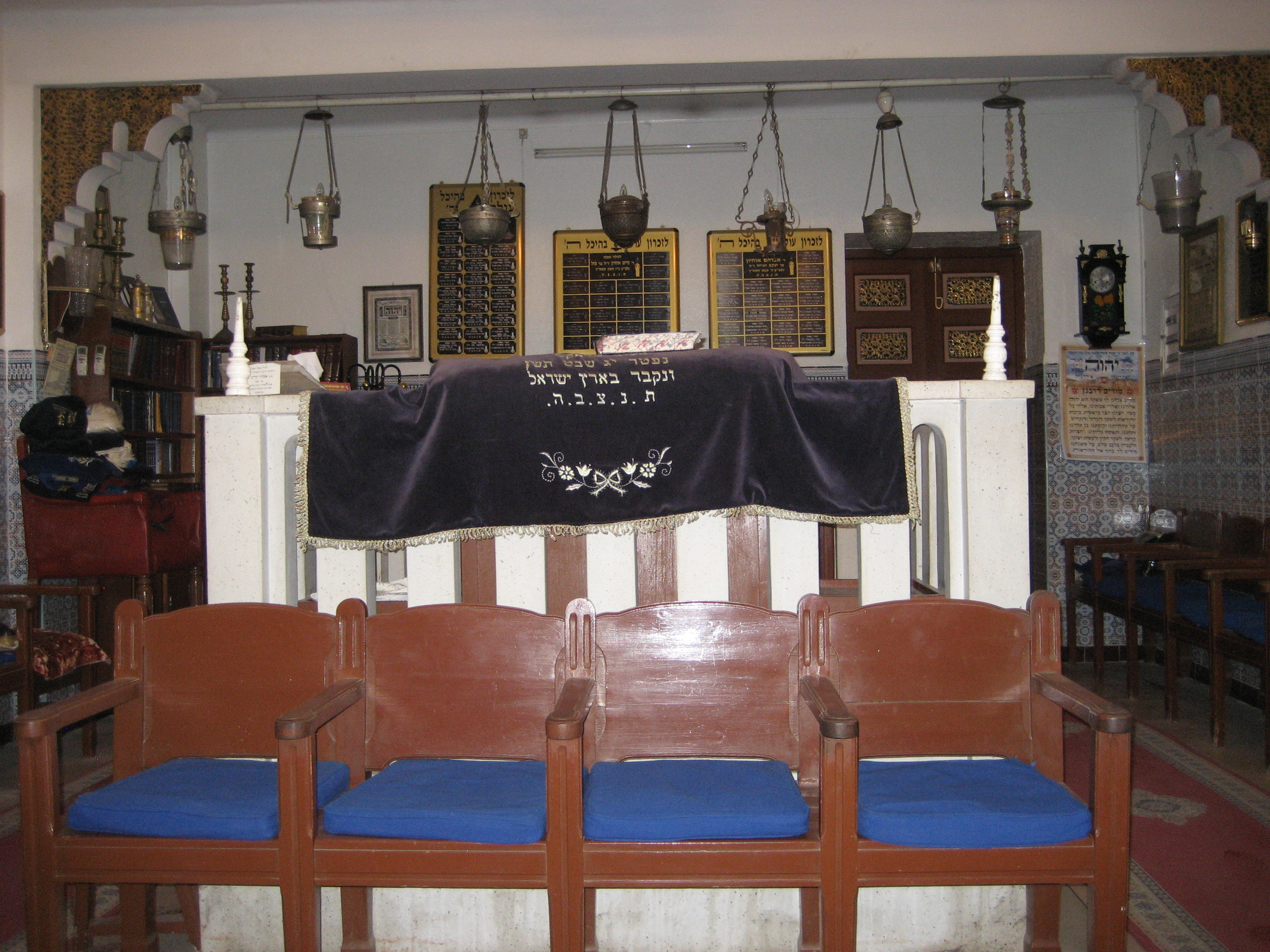
Synagogue in Marrakesh

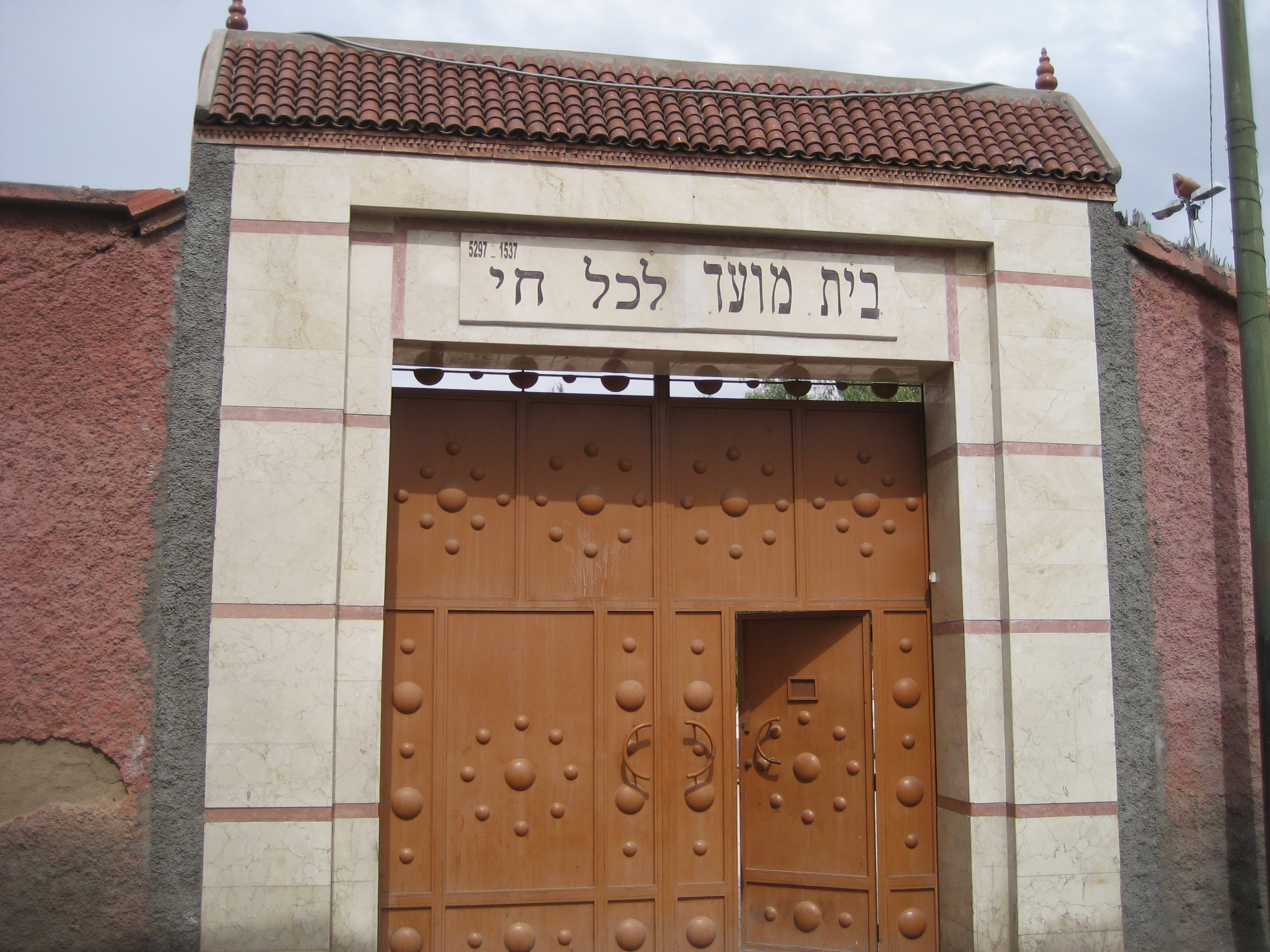
Entrance of the Jewish cemetery, Marrakesh

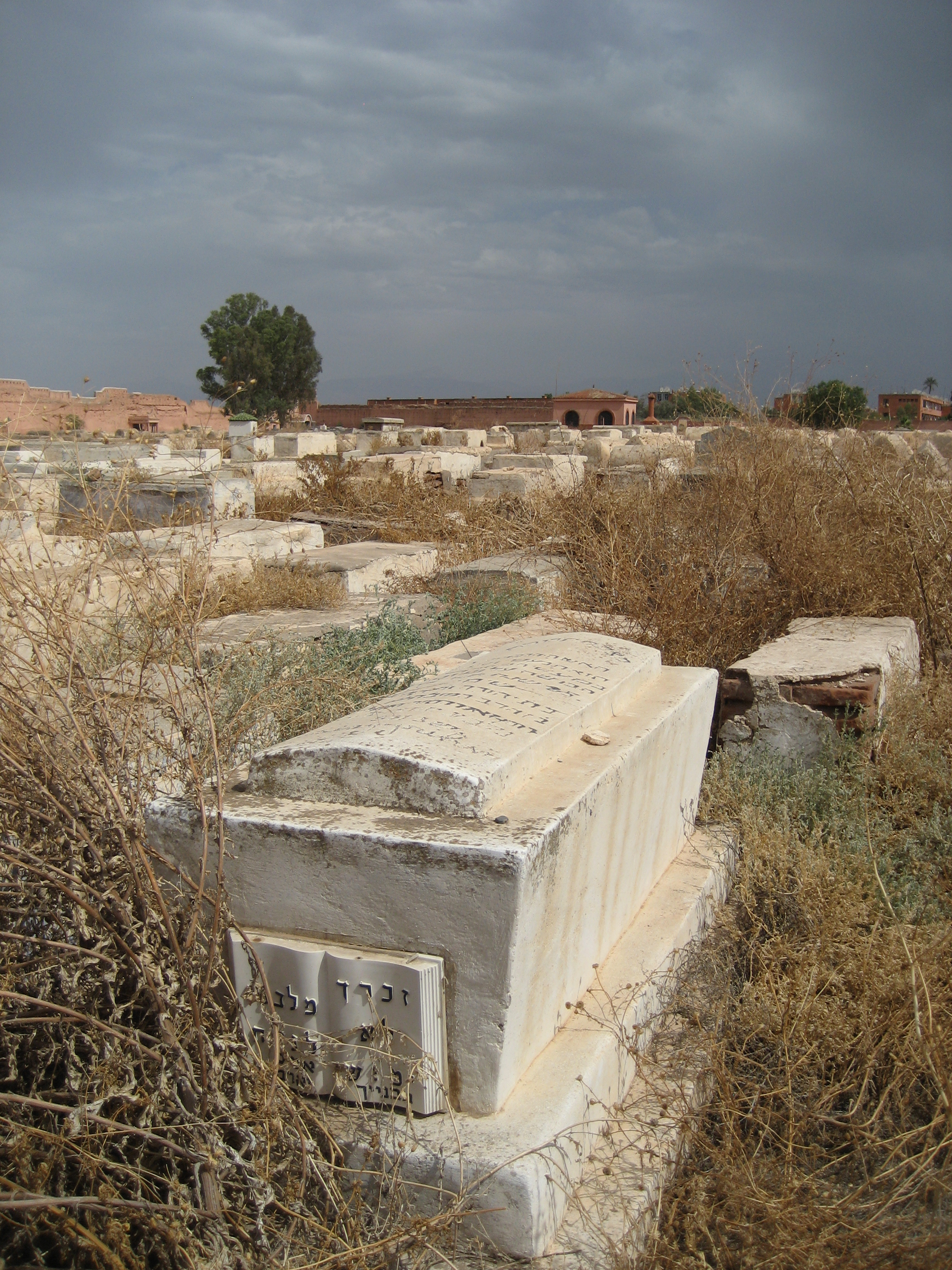
Jewish cemetery, Marrakesh

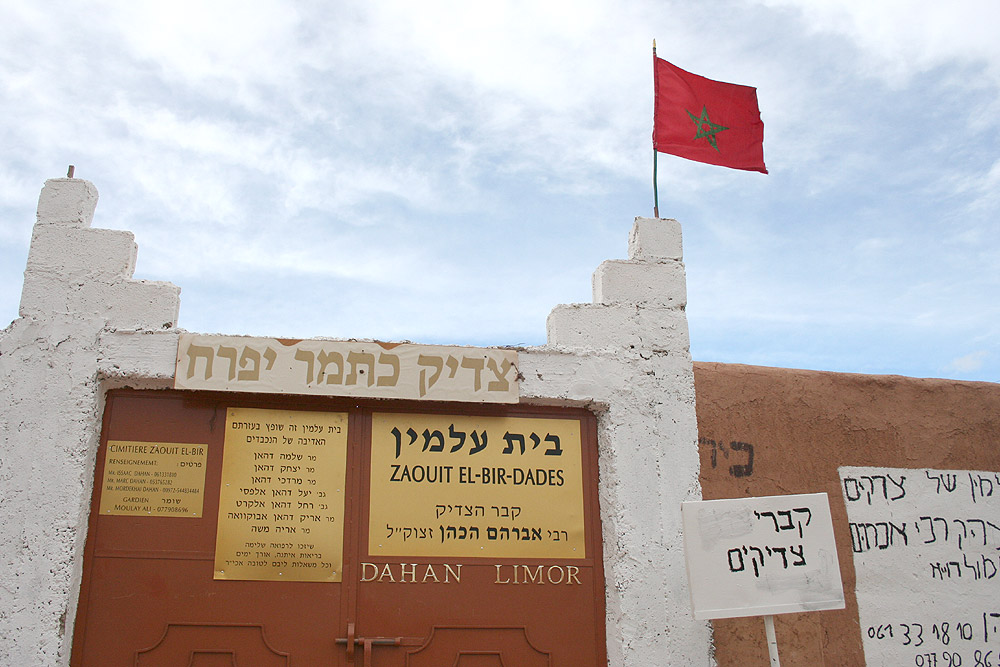
Zaouit el Bir Dades Cemetery South Morocco

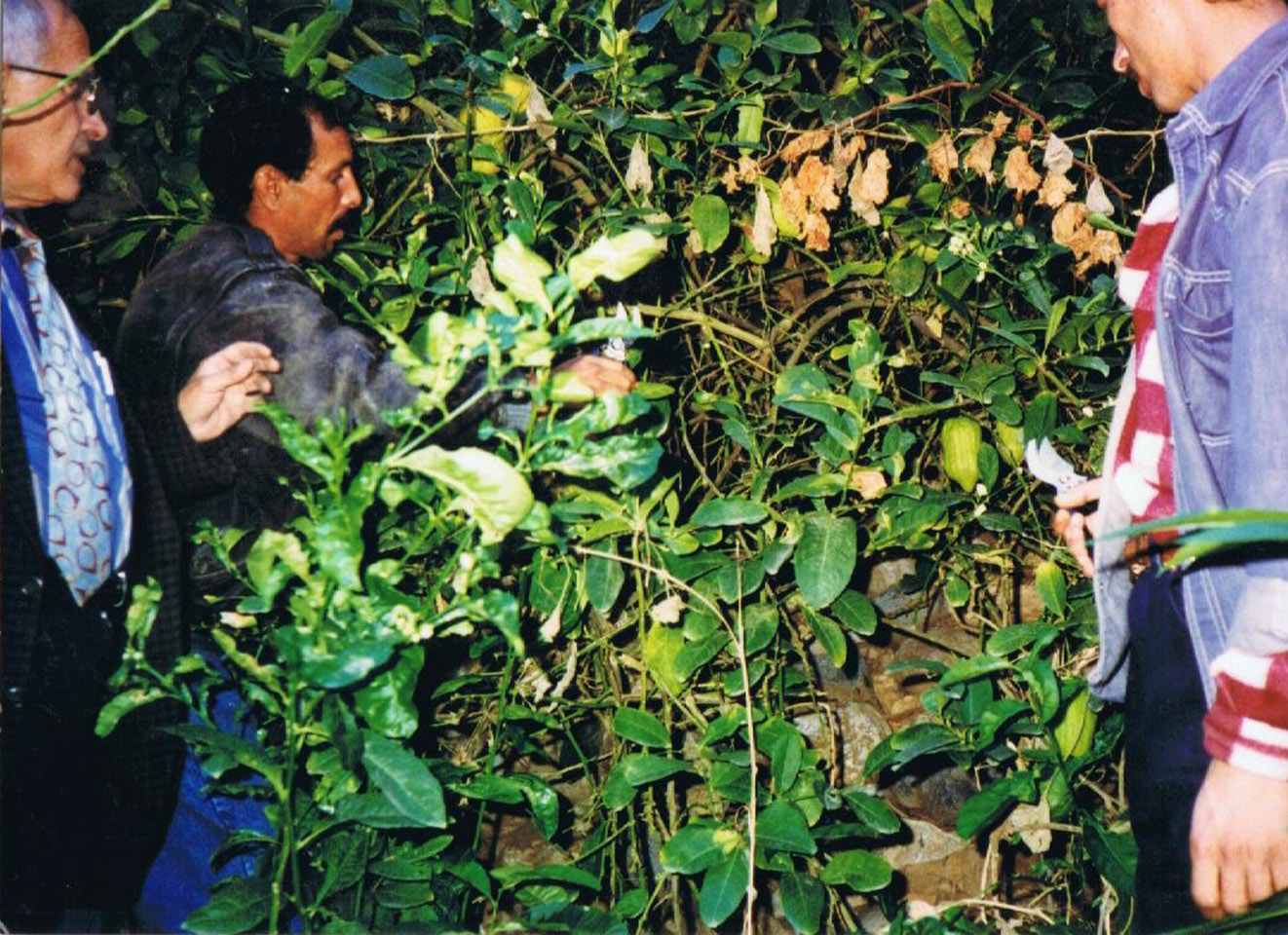
Moroccan etrog is an unbroken heritage appreciated by the worldwide Jewry

== See also ==
- History of the Jews in Africa

=== Regions: ===
- History of the Jews in Central Africa
- History of the Jews in East Africa
- History of the Jews in North Africa
- History of the Jews in Southern Africa
- History of the Jews in West Africa

=== Topics: ===
- Al Wifaq
- Cicurel family
- Antisemitism in the Arab world
- Antisemitism in Islam
- History of the Jews in Carthage
- History of the Jews under Muslim rule
- Islamic–Jewish relations
- List of Moroccan Jews
- Arab Jews
- Maghrebi Jews
- Mizrahi Jews
- Moroccan Jews
- Routes of Exile: A Moroccan Jewish Odyssey, a 1982 documentary about the origin and history of the Moroccan Jews
