= Al Fassiyine Synagogue =

Synagogue in Fez, Morocco

- Arabic: بيعة صلاة الفاسيين; Hebrew: בית הכנסת סלאת אל פאסיין
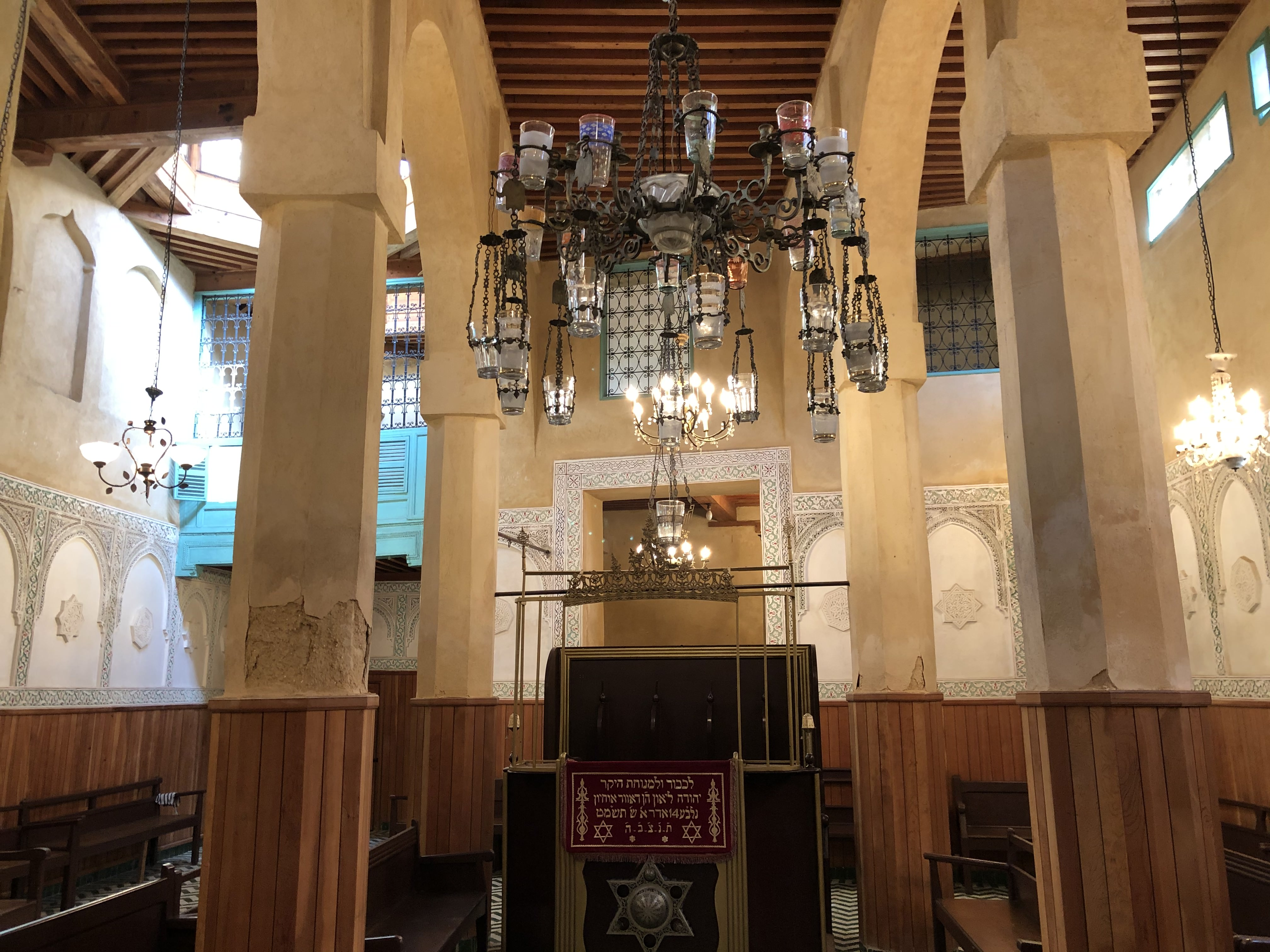

Religion
- Affiliation: Judaism
- Ecclesiastical or organisational status: Synagogue
- Status: Active

Location
- Location: Fez, Morocco
- Interactive map of Al Fassiyine Synagogue
- Coordinates: 34°03′12″N 4°59′27″W

Architecture
- Type: Synagogue
- Established: Before 1492 or 17th century (Note: Date uncertain; see article for details.)
- Completed: After 1792 (current building)

The Al Fassiyine Synagogue or Slat Al Fassiyine (Arabic: بيعة صلاة الفاسيين; Hebrew: בית הכנסת סלאת אל פאסיין) is a synagogue located in the Mellah (Jewish quarter) of Fez, Morocco. Reputed to be one of the oldest synagogues in Fez, it was one of the few synagogues where the non-Sephardic rituals of the toshavim (indigenous Moroccan Jews) continued up until the 20th century. The synagogue was subsequently neglected and eventually ceased to function in 1970, but was more later restored and reopened in 2013.

== History ==
Slat al-Fassiyin (meaning "Prayer of the Fessis" or "Prayer of the People from Fez") is reputed to be the oldest synagogue of the Mellah of Fez and one of the oldest in continuous use. Up until the 20th century, the synagogue preserved the older toshavim rituals that predated the influx of Sephardic Jews that followed the 1492 expulsion of Jews from Spain. Historians Susan Gilson Miller, Attilio Petruccioli and Mauro Bertagnin state that the retention of these earlier rituals suggests that the synagogue was founded prior to 1492. Art historian Michelle Huntingford Craig states that the synagogue was founded in the 17th century.

In 1790, the Alawi sultan Moulay Yazid expelled the Jews from the Mellah and turned Slat al Fassiyine into a prison. The exile lasted until Moulay Yazid's death in 1792, after which the Jewish community returned to the Mellah. The synagogue was probably rebuilt after this date.

The synagogue continued being used actively through the end of the 1950s, when most of the Jewish community left the country for Israel, France, and Montreal (Canada). After Morocco gained its independence from France in 1956, the synagogue fell into disrepair. It eventually closed in 1970. It was later turned into a carpet-making workshop and then a boxing gymnasium.

The synagogue was reinaugurated in February 2013 by the Prime Minister Abdelilah Benkirane, with the funds for the restoration coming from the German government, the Jewish community of Fez, the Foundation for Moroccan Jewish Cultural Heritage, and the Moroccan government.

== Architecture ==
The Slat Al Fassiyine is one of the largest synagogues in Fez, covering an area of 7.3 by 11.5 metres (24 by 38 ft). Like the Ibn Danan Synagogue, the other well-known synagogue of the district, it has a generally basilical layout. Its interior is divided into three aisles by two rows of three pillars supporting four pointed arches. It has a high ceiling, with two octagonal skylights and some windows along the upper walls providing natural light. The heikhal was originally located along one of the longer transverse walls of the main hall but has since been moved, while the tevah (pulpit) sits in the center of the hall. The women's section, which is unusually well-decorated, is located in an elevated gallery overlooking the main hall at one end, accessed by a staircase.

The building is plain on the outside, but the interior is decorated with zellij tilework below and carved stucco on the walls featuring vegetal and geometric star motifs, similar to the craftsmanship of other monuments in Fez. A horseshoe arch-shaped niche, surrounded by stucco decoration, also exists near the entrance.

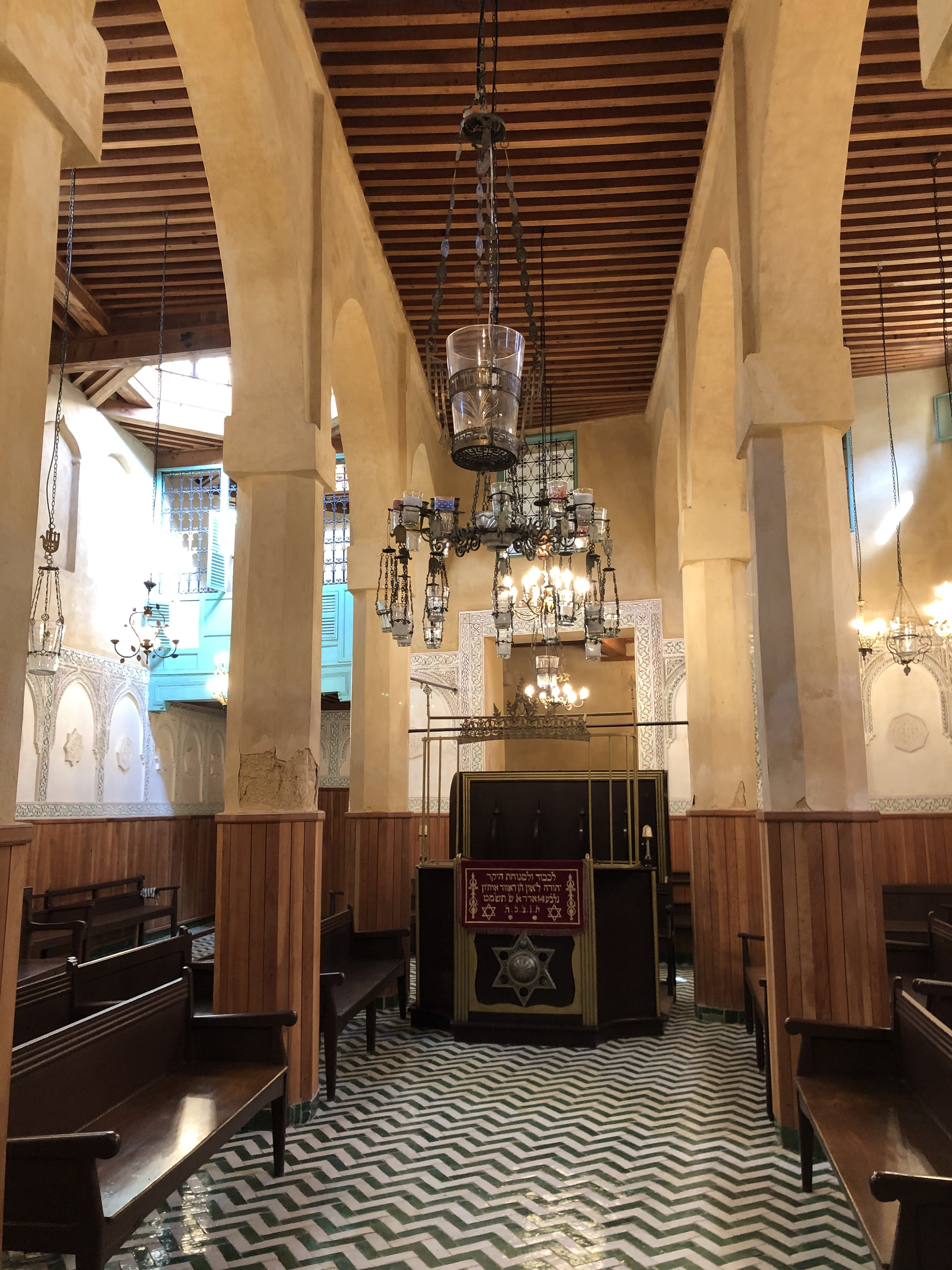
Main hall of the synagoguem with the tevah in the center

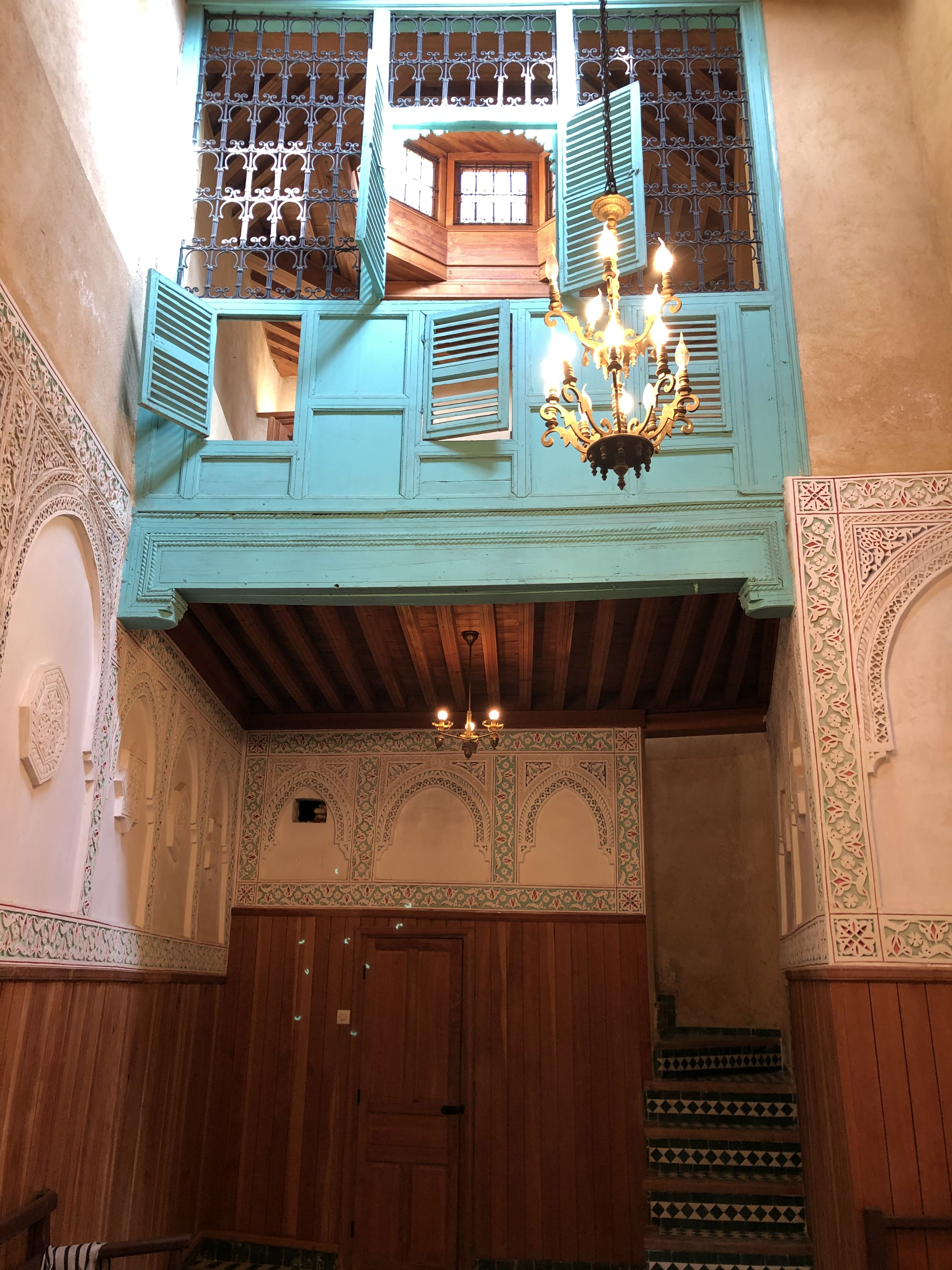
View towards the elevated women's gallery

== See also ==
- History of the Jews in Morocco
- List of synagogues in Morocco
