= Bab al-Amer =

City gate in Morocco

- باب الأمر
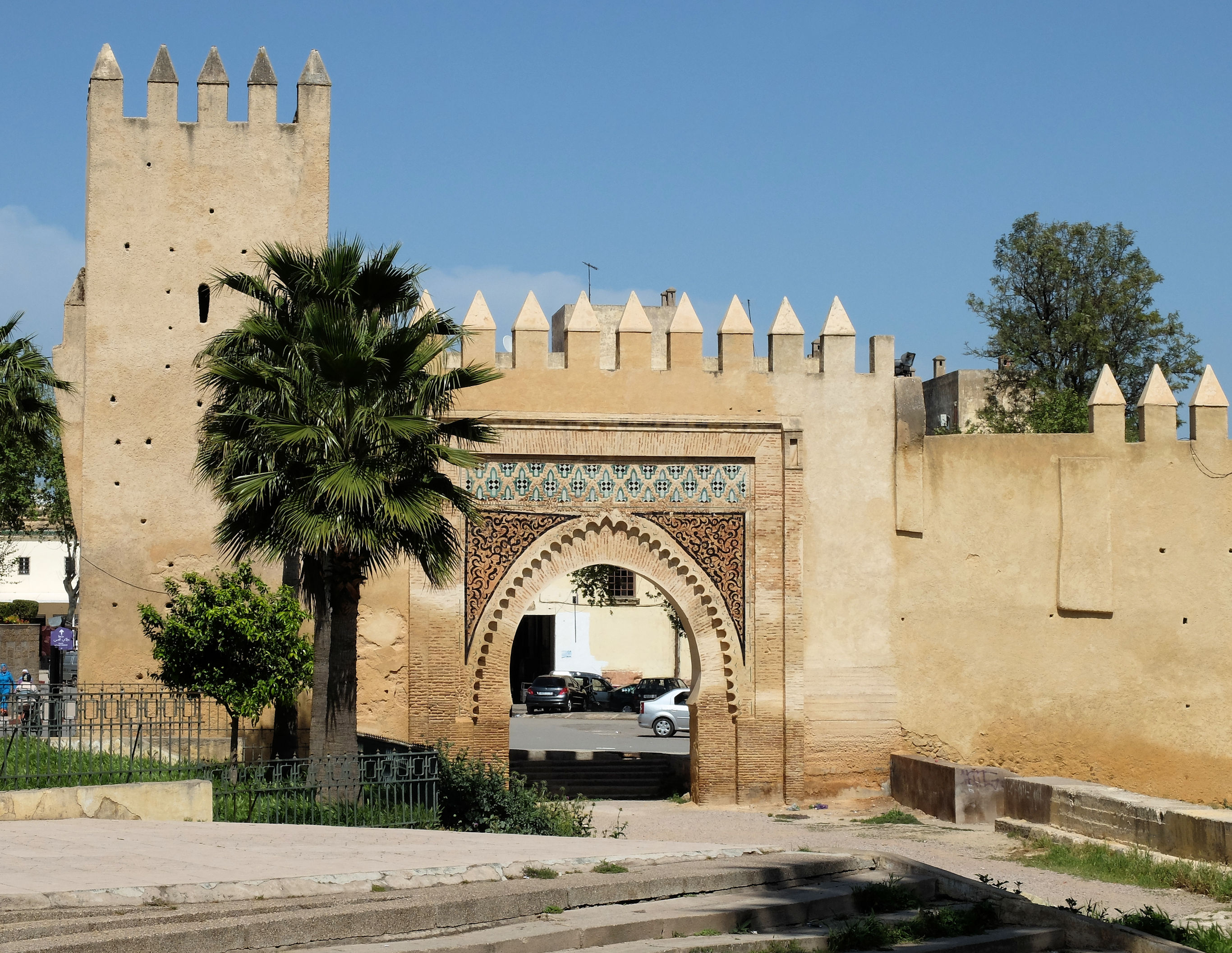
- Southern facade of the gate.
- Interactive map of the Bab al-Amer area

General information
- Type: city gate
- Architectural style: Moroccan
- Location: Fez, Morocco
- Coordinates: 34°03′5.2″N 4°59′38.9″W
- Completed: circa 1276 CE (date of foundation of Fes el-Jdid)

Bab al-Amer (Arabic: باب الأمر, lit. 'gate of order') is one of the historic city gates of Fez, Morocco. It was the southwestern entrance to Fes el-Jdid, the royal city founded in 1276 by the Marinids west of Fes el Bali.

== History ==
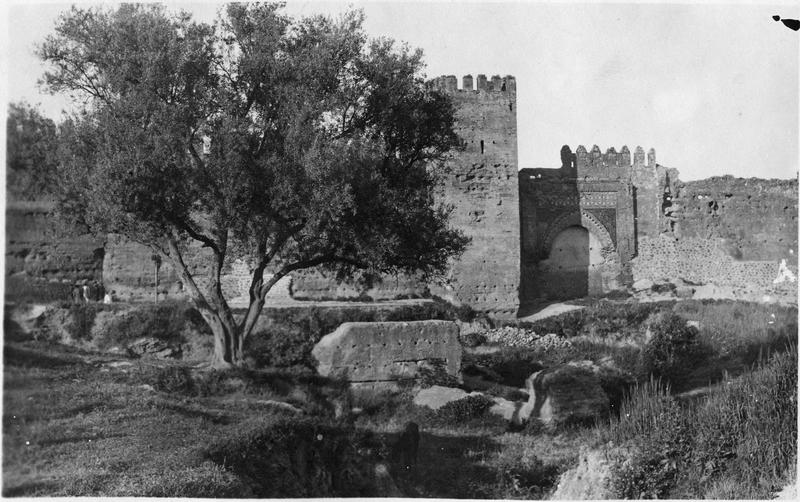
Remains of Bab al-Amer in 1916 (right of the tree)

Fes el-Jdid was founded as a fortified administrative city in 1276 by the Marinid sultan Abu Yusuf Ya'qub. The city was built with a perimeter of double walls, which in some areas (e.g. to the east and west) ran together while in other areas (to the north and south) diverged from each other. Between the inner and outer southern walls of the city was a district originally known as Hims which housed the sultan's regiments of Syrian archers. Bab al-Amer was the original western gate to this district. The gate's name means "Gate of Order", likely in reference to the barracks of the city guards located near it at the time. An aqueduct bringing water from the 'Ain al-'Omair source also passed into the city near the gate's location.

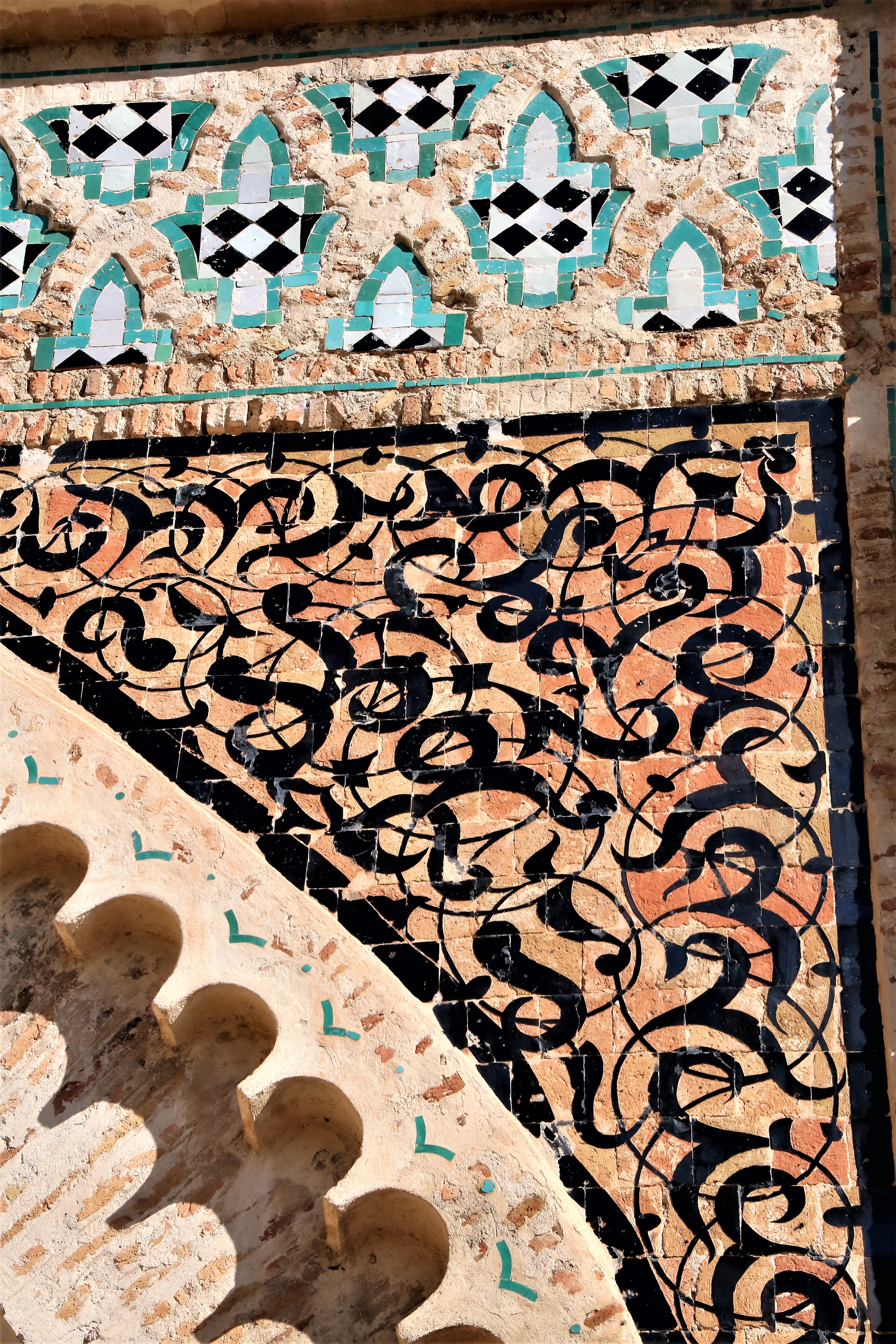
Details of the gate's decoration.

At some point before the late 16th century the Hims district was converted to the Jewish quarter (Mellah) of the city. One of the three Jewish cemeteries was established inside the gate to the northwest (on the site of the current Place des Alaouites), while another cemetery (the current remaining Jewish Cemetery) was established much later to the east. Most likely during the Saadian period, a bastion known as Borj al-Mahres was constructed just south of Bab al-Amer, to serve as a defensive fortification at the southwest corner of the city. The bastion was later demolished, along with some the surrounding ramparts, on the orders of the governor Hamdoun er-Rusi, appointed by Sultan Moulay Abdallah during his first reign (1729–1734), during a period of unrest and repression.

After the installation of the French Protectorate in 1912, major changes were made to the area. As the French administration judged the gate too narrow and inconvenient for traffic, they demolished the nearby aqueduct and much of the surrounding wall in order to build the main road that now passes next to it. They also created a vast open square on the site of the former Jewish cemetery to the northwest which became known as Place du Commerce and which is now known as Place des Alaouites. In the late 1960s and early 1970s, King Hassan II ordered the creation of a new entrance to the Royal Palace (Dar al-Makhzen) from Place des Alaouites, at which time the now famous gates of the palace were constructed here.
