= Ibn Danan Synagogue =

Synagogue in Fez, Morocco

- Arabic: بيعة ابن دنان; Hebrew: בית הכנסת אבן דנאן
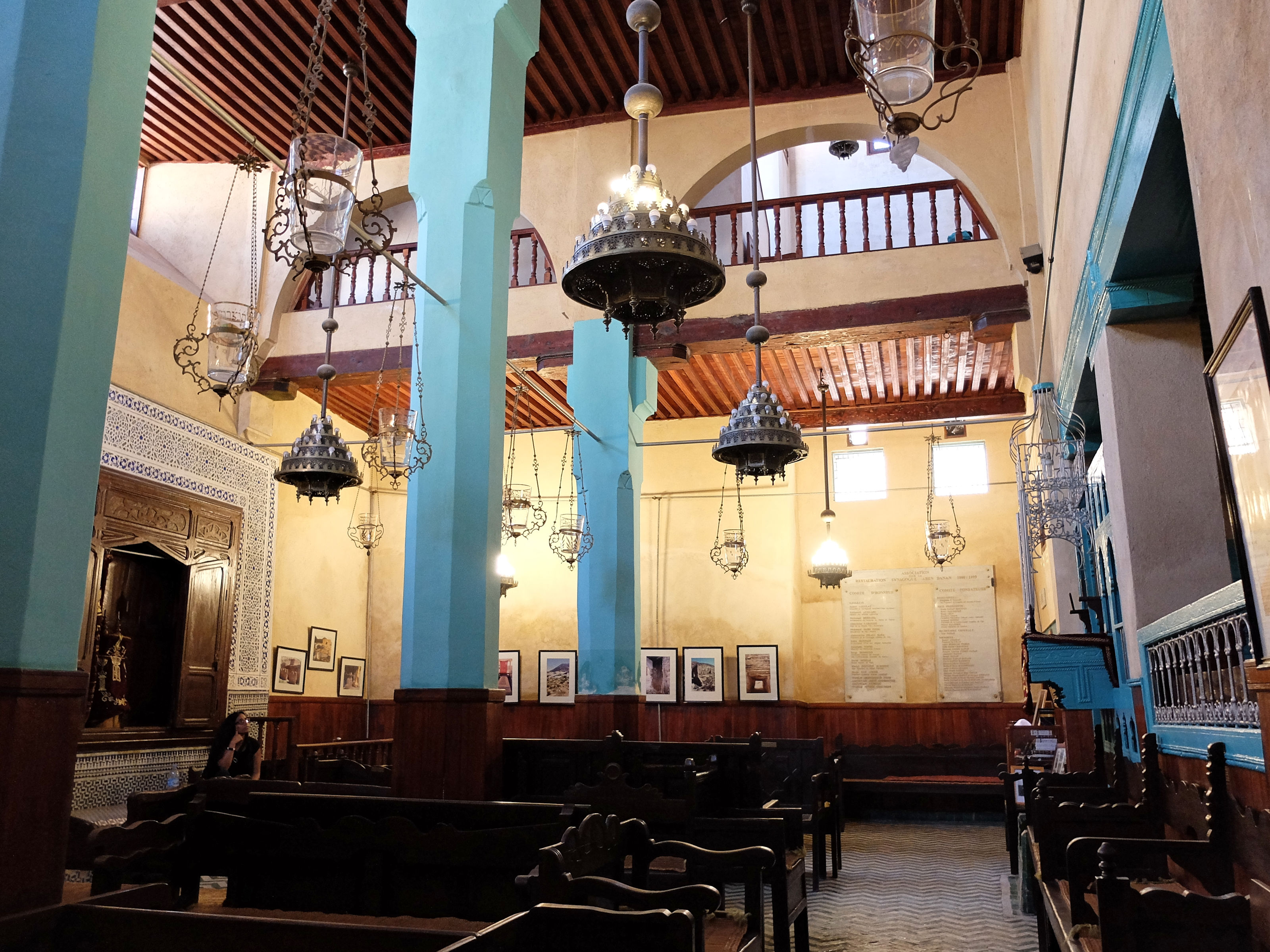

Religion
- Affiliation: Judaism
- Ecclesiastical or organisational status: Synagogue
- Status: Active

Location
- Location: Fez, Morocco
- Interactive map of Ibn Danan Synagogue
- Coordinates: 34°03′08″N 4°59′32″W

Architecture
- Type: Synagogue
- Style: Moorish; Moroccan
- Established: 17th century (first building)
- Completed: 1701 (current building, with later restorations)

The Ibn Danan Synagogue (Arabic: بيعة ابن دنان; (Note: Also known in Arabic as كنيس ابن دنان or صلاة شلومو بن دنان or معبد ابن دنان.) Hebrew: בית הכנסת אבן דנאן) is a synagogue located in the Mellah (Jewish quarter) of Fez, Morocco. The first synagogue on the site was built in the 17th century but the building has been destroyed, partially or completely, and restored on several occasions. Most recently, the synagogue was reopened in 1999 after another restoration.

== History ==
The synagogue's construction has been variously dated to the early 17th century or late 17th century, while historian Hicham Rguig dates it more specifically to 1680. It was originally built by Mimon Boussidan, (Note: Arabic: ميمون بوسيدان) a wealthy merchant of the toshavim notables of Fes, who is said to have been from the Zawiya Dila'iya of the town of Ait Ishaq. Like most of the Mellah's synagogues, it was likely destroyed or severely damaged on certain occasions and then rebuilt by the community. Art historian Michelle Huntingford Craig states that it was first destroyed in 1646 by the Saadi sultan Muhammad al-Shaykh al-Saghir and was rebuilt by 1701. It was probably damaged during the persecution of the Fassi Jewish community in 1790 and then repaired again.

From 1812 until the synagogue's closure in the 1960s, its rabbis all came from the Ibn Danan family. This family dynasty of rabbis can be traced back as far as Granada (present-day Spain) in the 15th century. The family probably fled from North Africa to Granada in the 15th century before returning to Morocco in 1492 following the expulsion of Jews from Spain. The synagogue is now named after Rabbi Shlomo Ibn Danan, who oversaw the synagogue during the early 20th century.

One early restoration of the synagogue is known to have taken place in the 1870s. More recently, the Jewish community of Fez has also struggled for its preservation, and successfully nominated the building to the 1996 World Monuments Watch of the World Monuments Fund. According to the Fund, the plaster was peeling, the roofs were collapsing, the waterlogged beams were rotting, and windows were broken and missing. The organization helped restore the synagogue with funding from American Express and in collaboration with Morocco's Ministry of Culture and the Judeo-Moroccan Cultural Heritage Foundation (Fondation du Patrimoine Culturel Judeo-Marocain). Following the restoration, the synagogue reopened in 1999.

In 1997, amid the restoration work, a mikveh, or ritual bath, was discovered against the eastern wall of the synagogue. Excavations revealed a vault beneath the bimah with stairs leading down to a square basin fed by an underground water channel.

== Architecture ==
The synagogue was once only one of several inside the walls of Fes, and not the most elaborate. It is entered through a simple doorway indistinguishable from the doors of nearby houses. The door leads immediately to a short flight of stairs that lead into the high, rectangular space of the synagogue. The construction is brick masonry and lime mortar, coated with plaster. The synagogue was built against the outer wall of the Mellah in a space where other amenities for the local community were historically located. Unlike many of Fez's other historic synagogues, this one was originally built as a place of prayer rather than as a house that was subsequently converted into a synagogue.

The main room inside the synagogue is divided by a row of three pillars. The interior is lit by small windows high in the walls. Photos taken in 1954 show a ceiling hung with numerous memorial lamps, now vanished. The wooden ceiling is beamed and painted. The walls are wainscotted with blue figured Moroccan tiles. The large Torah ark (hekhal), a cupboard filling the width of an entire wall, is made of carved wood. The wall above is decorated with intricately carved plaster work. Opposite the Torah ark is a raised alcove, separated from the main prayer space by a wooden screen elaborately carved with a series of arches. It was intended as a seating area for the congregation's more distinguished members. The bimah (or tevah) is accessed from this space, constructed as a small platform cantilevered out from the raised area. The wooden bimah is topped by a wrought iron canopy of Islamic-style arches and floral forms, culminating in a crown.

Under the main hall is a subterranean vaulted chamber reached by a narrow staircase, which was rediscovered during restoration in the late 1990s. This chamber probably served as a cellar, while a passage to its side also gives access to a mikveh or bath for ritual ablutions, with access to a water source. Originally, the mikveh was probably open to the outside within a courtyard or at the end of an alley, but at a later point it was closed off due to the construction of new structures against the wall of the synagogue. The stairway was thus created from inside the synagogue to allow continued access.

Elements of the synagogue

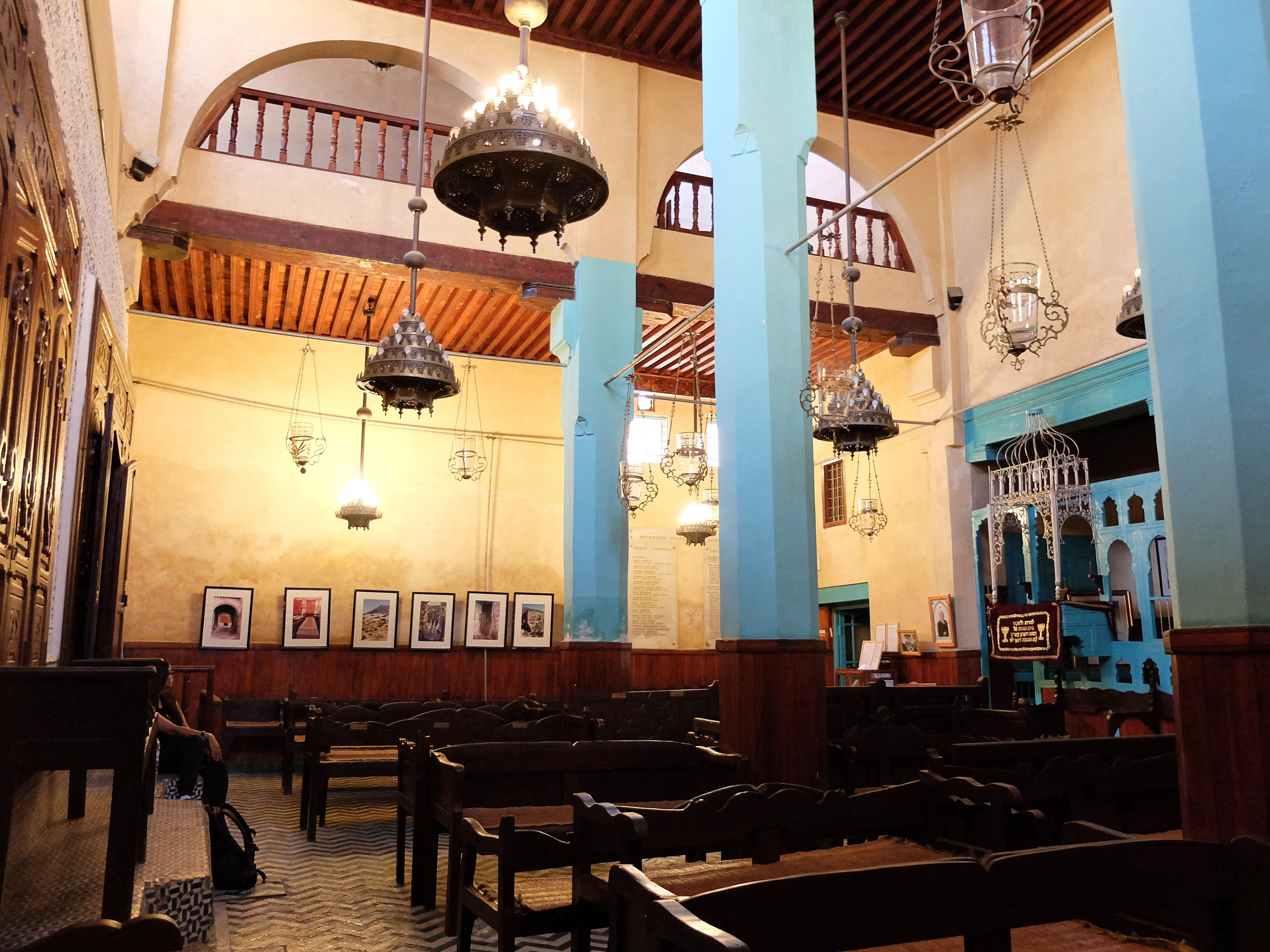
Interior of the synagogue

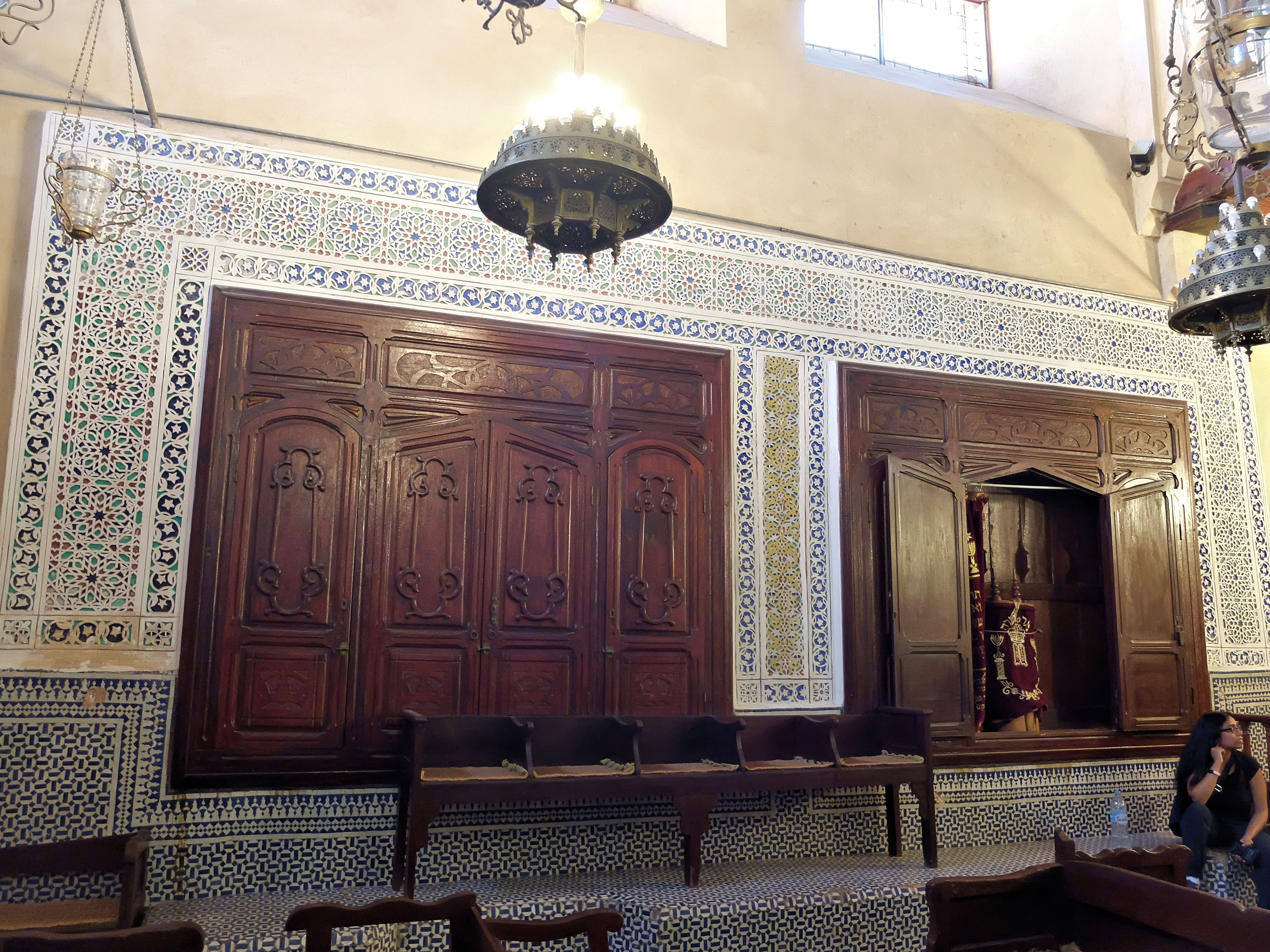
Wall containing the hekhal. Traditional zellij tiles are visible along the lower wall and carved stucco decoration is seen around and above.

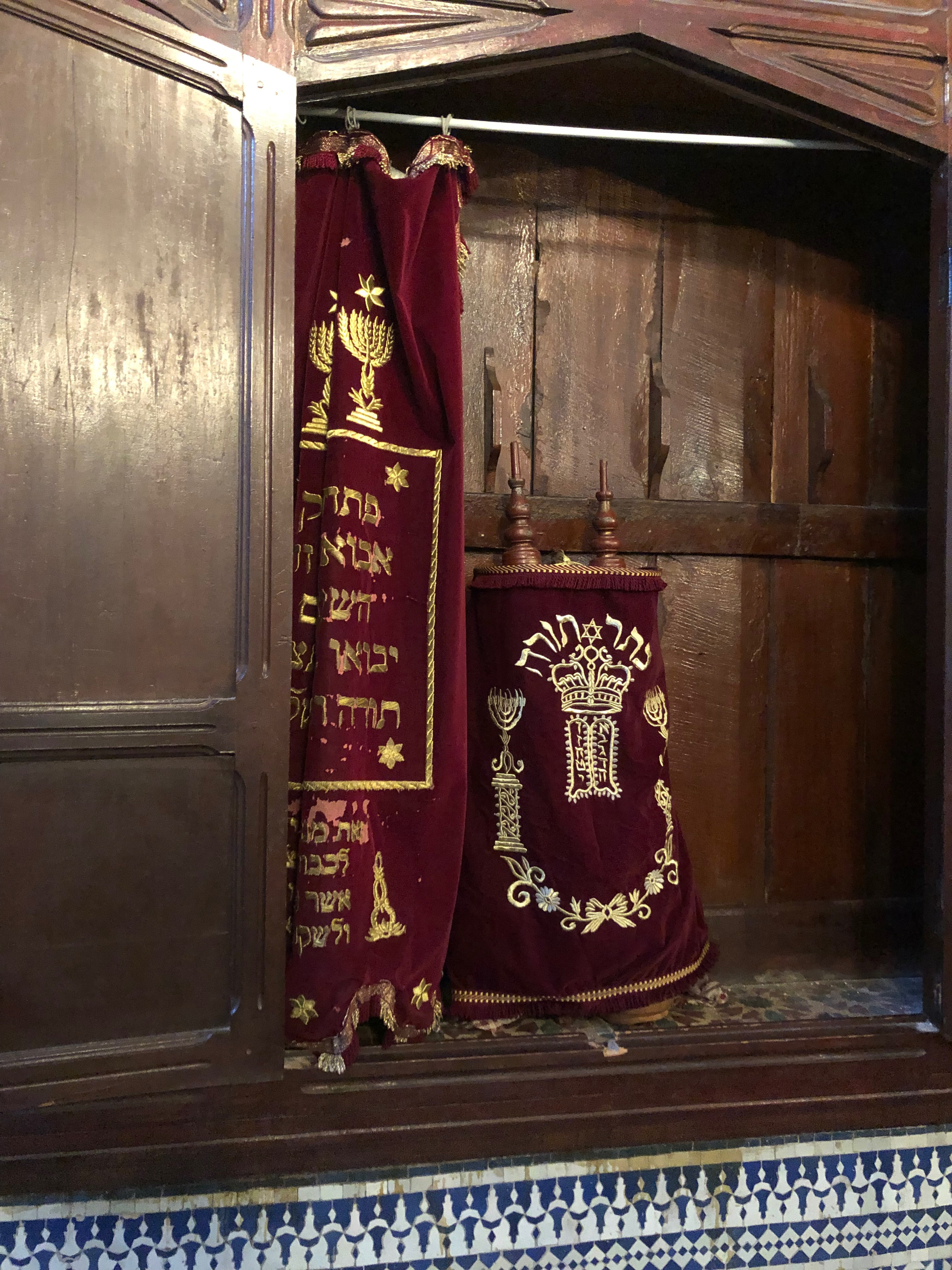
The hekhal containing the Sefer Torah

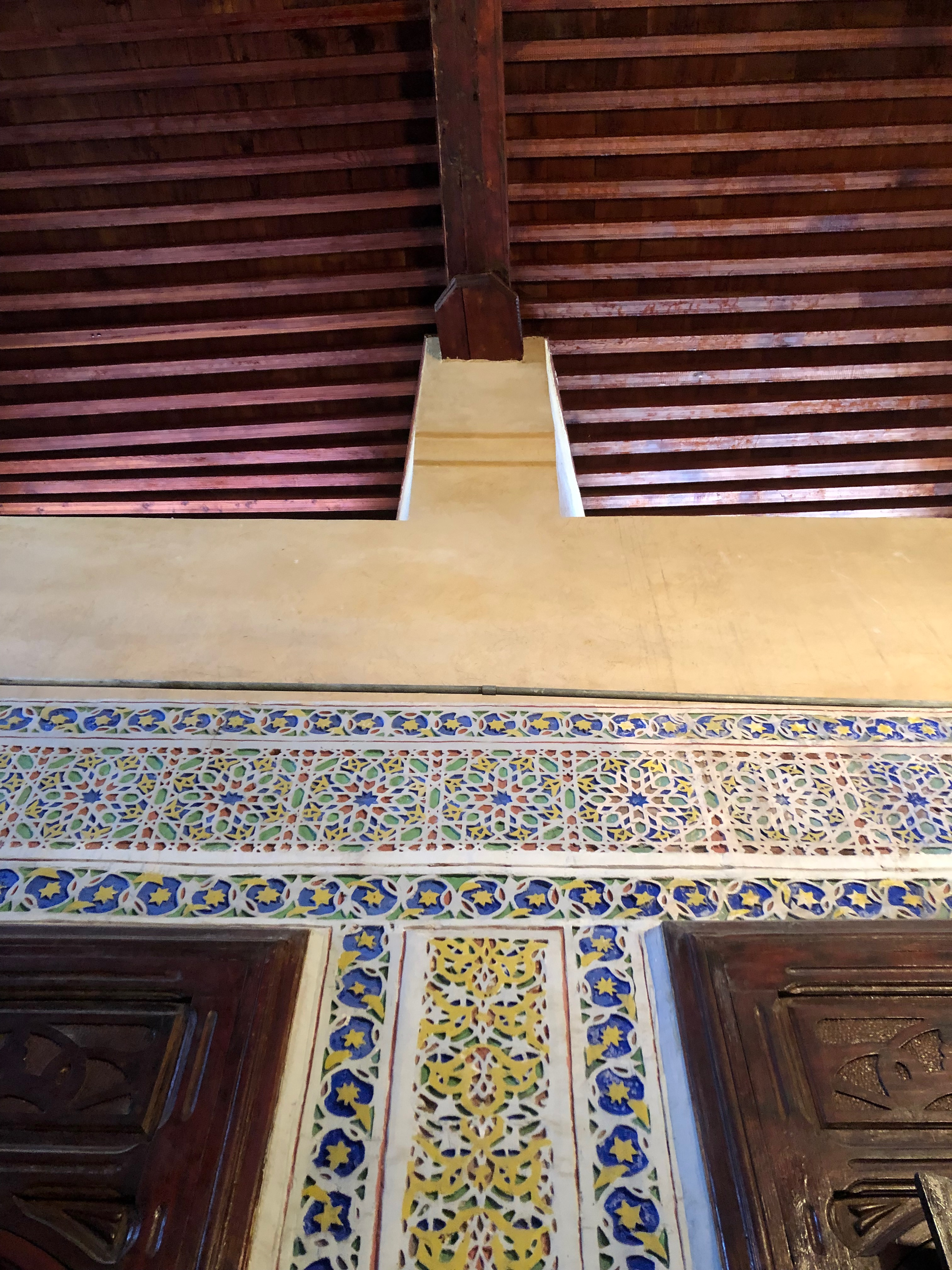
Detail of the stucco decoration

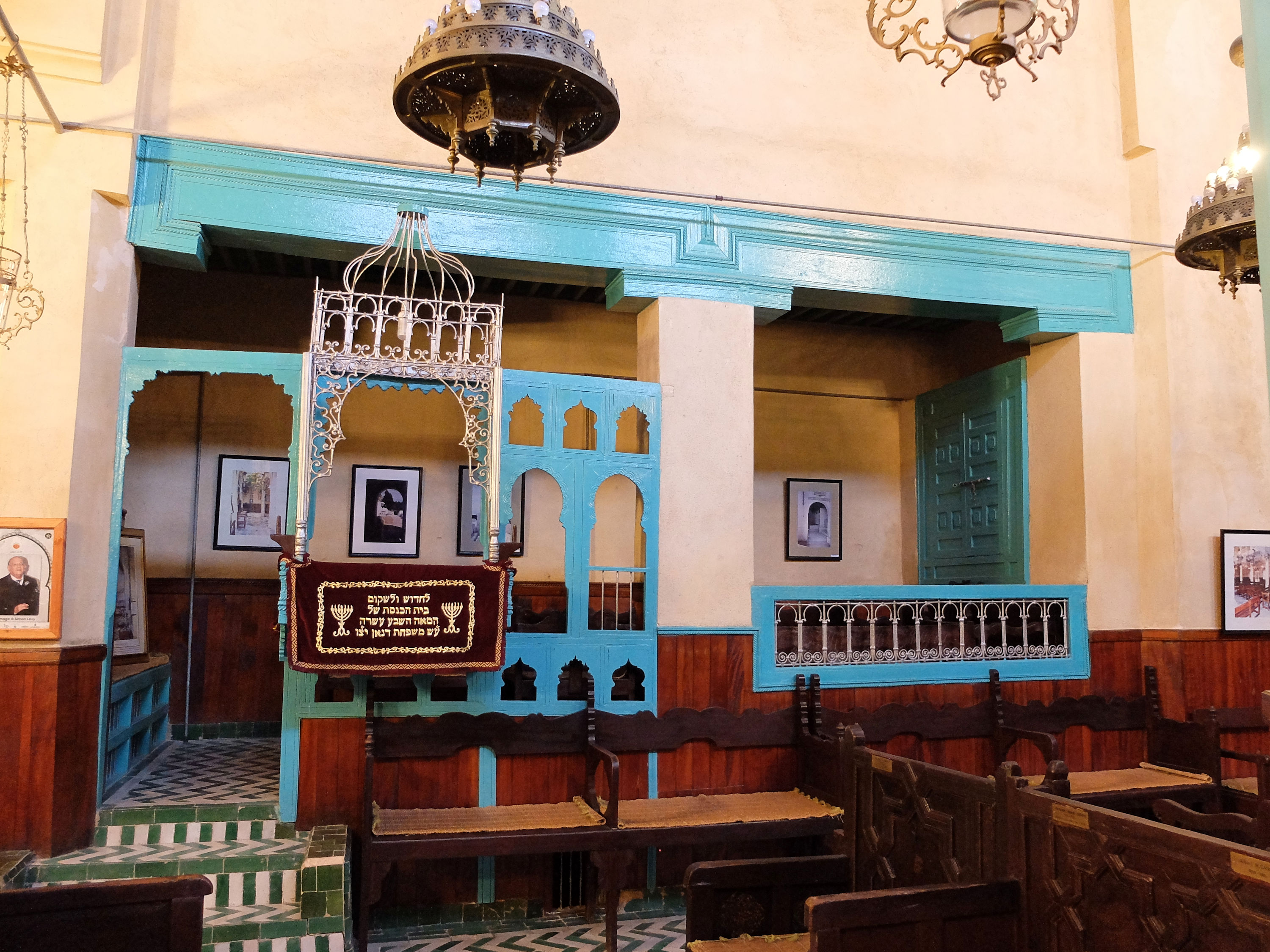
View of the bimah (center left) and the raised alcove room

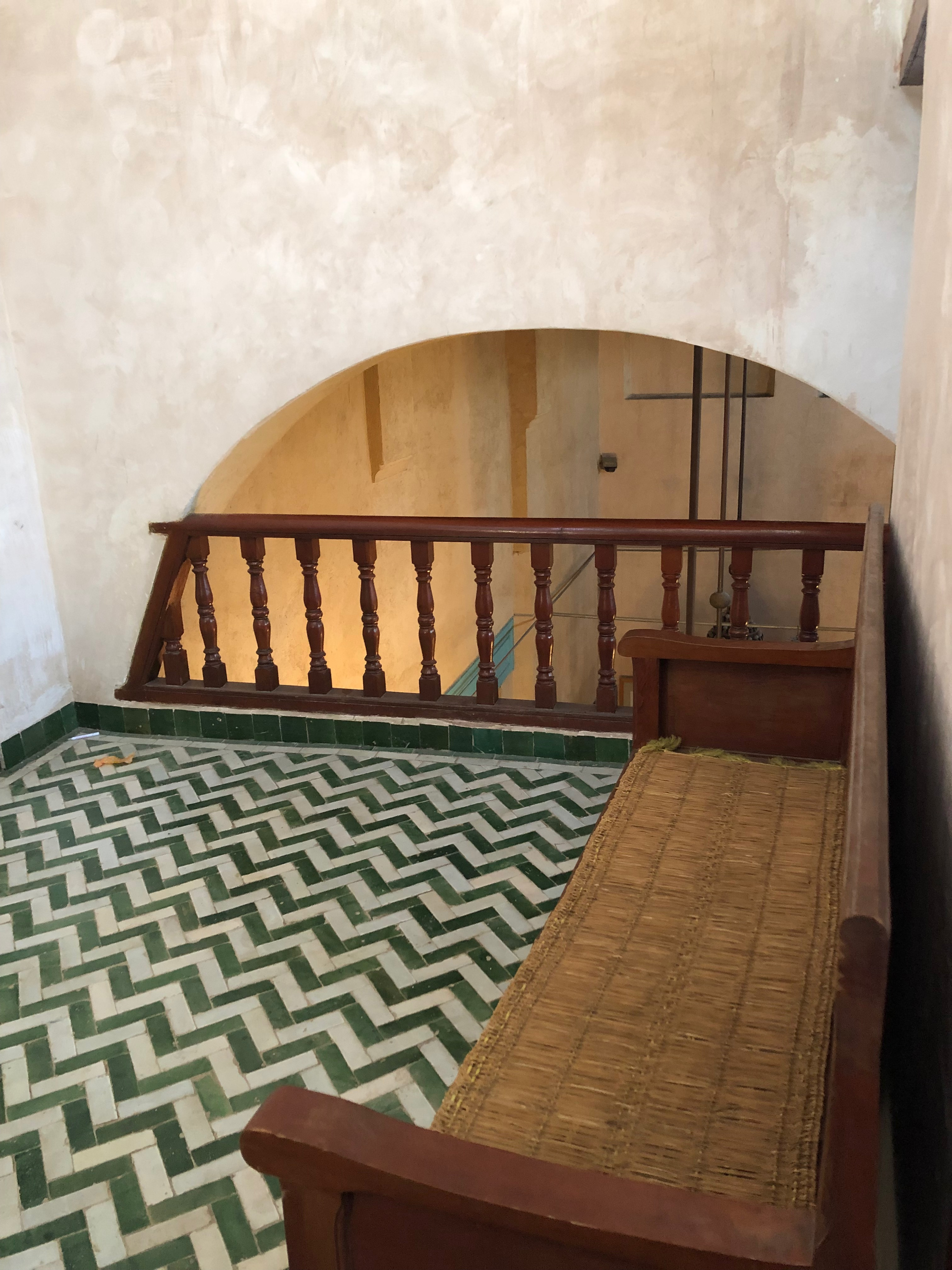
The mechitza balcony, a space for women to worship

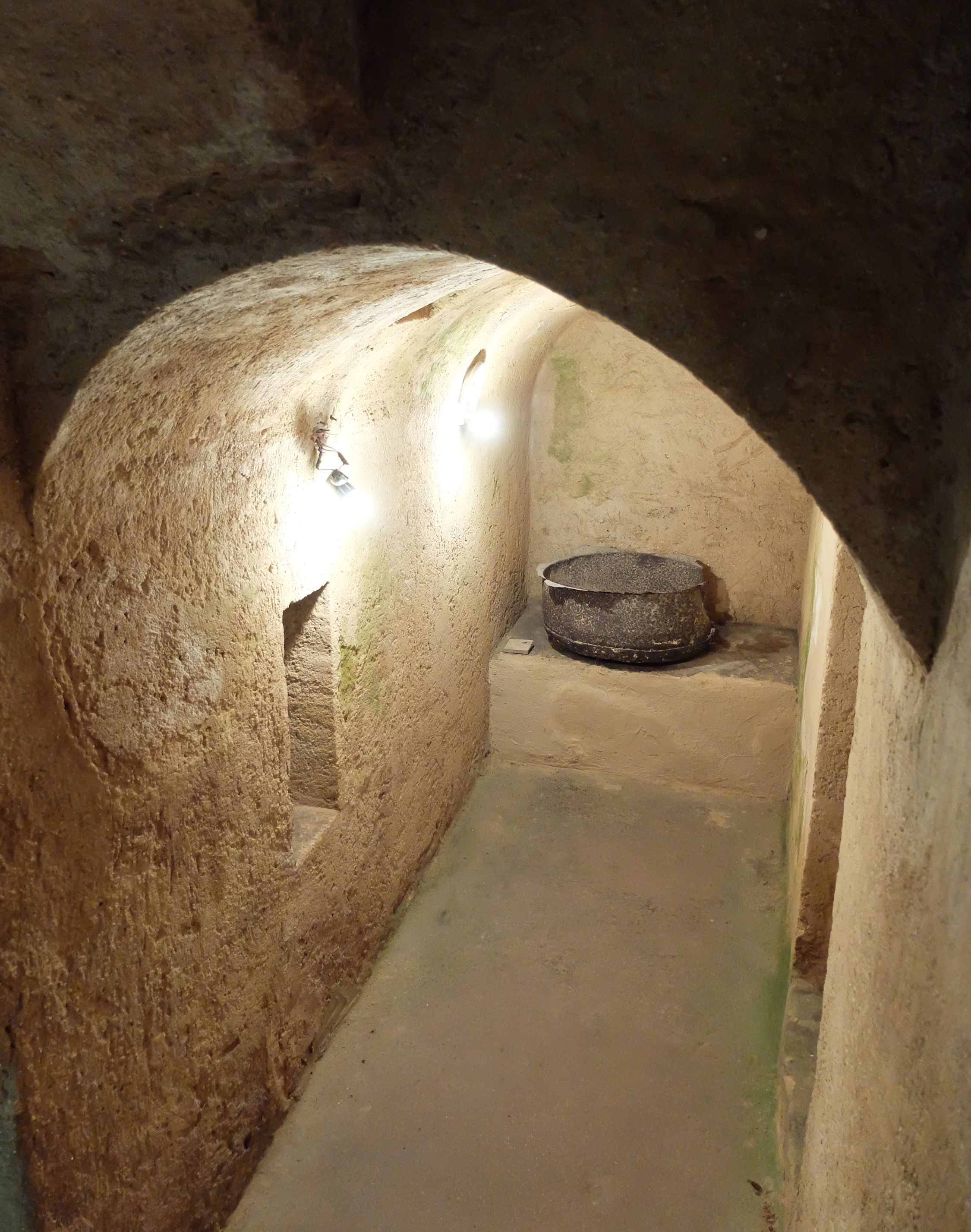
The underground cellar which leads to the mikveh (ritual bath)

== See also ==
- History of the Jews in Morocco
- List of synagogues in Morocco
