= Toshavim and Megorashim =

Terms for Jewish communities in the Maghreb

Toshavim (Hebrew: תושבים, "residents") or Bildiyīn (Moroccan Arabic: بلديين, lit. 'of the country, natives') and Megorashim (Hebrew: מגורשים "expelled") or Rūmiyīn (Moroccan Arabic: روميين, lit. 'Romans, Europeans, foreigners') are terms used to refer to the two mutually constitutive groups within Jewish communities in the Maghreb especially after the Catholic Monarchs' 1492 Alhambra Decree; Toshavim and Bildiyīn refer to local Berber or Arabized Maghrebi Jews who had been inhabiting the lands in which the Sephardic Jews expelled from Iberia (Portugal and Spain) in the late 15th century settled, and Megorashim and Rūmiyīn refer to those Iberian Jews who settled in the Maghreb.

== Background ==
Jewish migration between North Africa and the Iberian Peninsula was common in the medieval period and ebbed and flowed according to shifting political and economic conditions. For example, Iberian Jews sought refuge in North Africa during persecutions under the Visigothic Kingdom in the seventh century, before the Muslim conquests.

== Toshavim ==
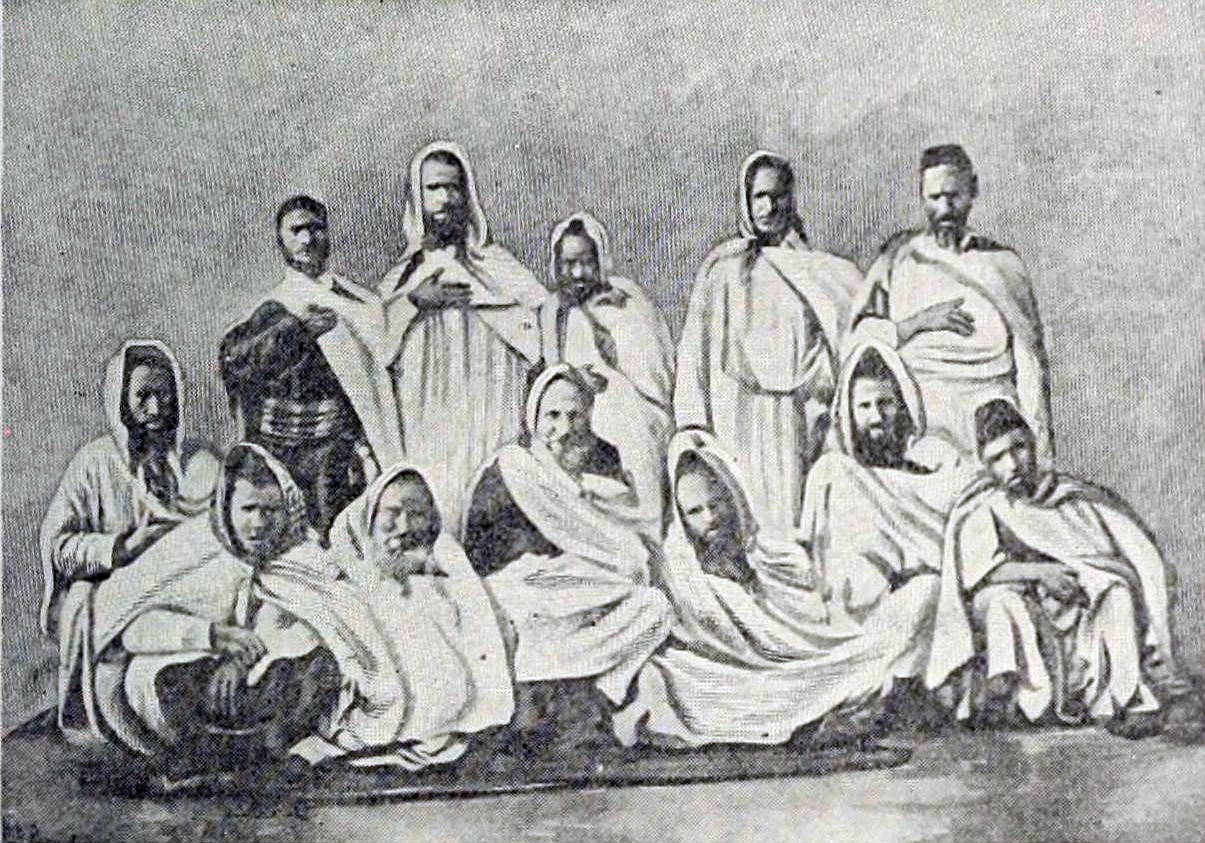
Berber Jews c. 1900

The terms Toshavim (Hebrew: תושבים, "residents") or bildiyīn (Moroccan Arabic: بلديين, lit. 'of the country, natives') refer generally to the local Berber or Arabized Maghrebi Jews who had been inhabiting lands in which the Jews expelled from Spain in 15th century settled. In particular, the term "Toshavim" was applied to the Jews of Morocco. Both groups are considered indigenous to the area despite their migration and diaspora origins.

During the Middle Ages migration between the Iberian Peninsula and North Africa was common due to local political and economic conditions and depending on the ruling kingdom and treatment of Jews. Jews from Spain often fled to Morocco as early as the seventh century and during the twelfth century, Jews in both countries fled, crossing back and forth between the two lands.

Toshavim had their own minhagim (Judaic traditions) and they spoke Judeo-Arabic or Judeo-Berber dialects.

The new arrivals did not always deal well with the local Jews. For example, in Algiers they called the local Jews derisively "turban-wearers" and vice versa, the Spanish Jews were called "beret-wearers".

Despite the fact that Toshavim were apparently overwhelmed and absorbed by Sephardic immigrants, the differences in many areas of communal lives of Toshavim and Megorashim persisted for a very long time: separate negidim, separate synagogues, separate teachers, separate cemeteries, etc. For example, in Fez, Morocco, the common minhag for (most of) the two communities was accepted only in 18th century.

== Megorashim ==
The terms Megorashim (Hebrew: מגורשים "expelled") or rūmiyīn (Moroccan Arabic: روميين, lit. 'Romans, Europeans, foreigners') refer to Jews from the Iberian Peninsula who arrived in North Africa as a result of the anti-Jewish persecutions of 1391 and the expulsion of Jews from Spain in 1492. These migrants were distinct from pre-existing North African Jews called Toshavim. The Toshavim had been present in North Africa since ancient times, spoke the local languages (Darija or Tamazight), and had traditions that were influenced by Maghrebi Islam. The Megorashim influenced North African Judaism, incorporating traditions from Spain. They eventually merged with the Toshavim, so that it is now difficult to distinguish between the two groups. The Jews of North Africa are often referred to as Sephardi, a term that emphasizes their Iberian traditions.

=== Migrations ===
The first migration took place following the persecutions of 1391 in Catalonia, Valencia and the Balearic Islands. Many Megorashim took refuge along the North African coast, especially in Algeria. Among them were prestigious rabbis like Isaac ben Sheshet and Simeon ben Zemah Duran. Of the 40,000 to 70,000 Jews who left Spain in 1492 following the Alhambra decree, the Jewish Encyclopedia estimates that 32,000 reached the coast of North Africa; (20,000 in Morocco, 10,000 in Algeria). Others say, however, that it is impossible to really estimate how many Iberian Jews found refuge in Morocco and the Maghreb.

=== Communities ===
These Jews had their own leaders, rabbis and spiritual leaders as well as their own minhag. They spoke the different languages of the Iberian Peninsula from which they originated (Castilian, Aragonese, Catalan, Galician, etc.) and a standardized Judeo-Spanish form, called Judezmo, has long been used by the diaspora.

After 1391, the Megorashim had settled mainly in Algeria (Algiers and its adjacent cities, Tlemcen, Oran, Ténès, Béjaïa, Constantine), Tunisia (Tunis), and Morocco (Meknes, Fez, and Debdou, with the capture of Seville). Following the expulsion edict of 1492, new waves of Megorashim came to North Africa, specifically Tetouan, Fez, Meknes, Rabat, Salé, and Marrakesh. They then moved to Mogador when the Alawite King Mohammed ben Abdallah invited the Jews to settle there and take care of relations with the Portuguese Empire.

In most of the communities where they settled, the Megorashim imposed their rabbis and their reforms. Many eventually merged with local the Toshavim. According to Moisés Orfali, however, the Spanish-speaking Tetuani Jews would refer to all other Moroccan Jews—including Toshavim as well as Megorashim that became Arabized and lost the ability to speak Ladino—as forasteros 'outsiders'.

According to Richard Ayoun, the Megorashim were at the origin of the revival of the Maghrebi Judaism strongly weakened by Almohad persecution. The arrival of Rabbi Ephraim Alnaqua of Seville at the end of 1391 in Tlemcen allowed Jews settled in the neighboring towns of Honaine and Ajdir to settle in the city itself. In Tetouan, where they formed the main Jewish component of the city, the Megorashim imposed their Judeo-Spanish language known as Haketia. In Algiers in the 15th century, the Jews were classified in several categories: those native to Africa, those coming from the Balearic Islands and Spain or from France, by Constantinople and Italy.

In the 16th century, Spanish attacks on the shores of Algeria and North Africa often pushed the Jews to abandon the coast for the interior of the land. This provoked several times the expulsion of Jews from the city of Oran and the destruction of Béjaïa and Algiers. The defeat of the Spanish on the taking of the city was famous by the Jewish community during the Purim of Algiers. With the Spanish protectorate in northern Morocco from the 19th century, we are witnessing the first reconciliation between Sephardis and Spaniards, and many Jews from Tetuan settled in Gibraltar, Spain, and Latin America at the same time.

In Mogador and along the Atlantic coast, Jews are generally heavily involved in trade between Morocco and Portugal. Within the regency of Algiers and Tunis the trade with Europe and the rest of the Ottoman Empire was often the fact of the Megorashim, especially the Grana of Livorno who had settled there since the 16th century.

Megorashim relations with, and influence over, the Toshavim varies widely among the communities in which they settled. This European influence on the local way of life tended to ignore the population living on the edge of urban centers, or even provoked a hostile reaction.

== See also ==
- Lançados
- Berber Jews
- Sephardic Bnei Anusim
- North African Sephardim

=== Groups ===
- Granas
- Marrano
- Haketia

=== Communities ===
- History of the Jews in Morocco
- History of the Jews in Algeria
- History of the Jews in Tunisia

- Musta'arabi Jews
- Terefah controversy, a severe halakhic controversy about a specific type of terefah, among the Fez Jewry between Toshavim and Megorashim
- Al Fassiyine Synagogue
