= Jewish community in Casablanca =

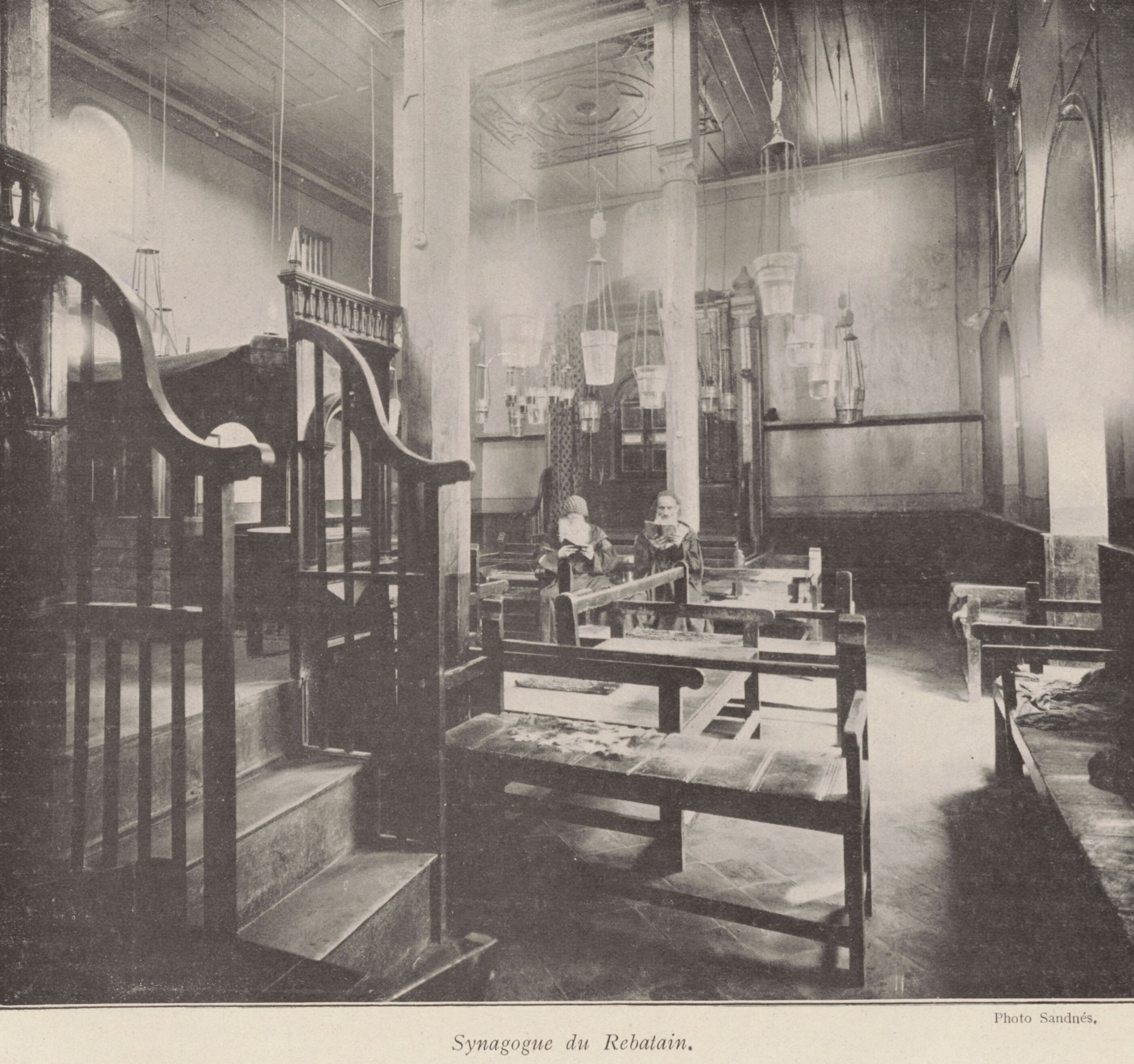
Two men reading in a synagogue of the Mellah of Casablanca. 1918

In the 20th century, Casablanca became the center of Jewish life in Morocco and home to the largest Jewish community in the Maghreb, with more than 80 synagogues and many Jewish social, cultural, and charitable organizations. In the 21st century, it is the largest Jewish community in the Arab world.

The Jewish community in Casablanca traditionally lived in the city's mellah, though class stratification in the Jewish community intensified during French colonial rule (formally 1912–1956, though occupied since 1907), and the mellah increasingly became the home of Casablanca's Jewish lower classes as the wealthy moved into apartments and villas beyond its walls.

Although the city's Jewish population decreased through the 1960s and 1970s, the percentage of Moroccan Jews living in Casablanca in relation to the rest of Morocco steadily increased as the majority of the country's Jewish population emigrated, especially through programs such as Cadima and Operation Yachin.

== History ==
=== Anfa ===
There is evidence of a Jewish community in Anfa, as the port city was known before the 18th century, before it was destroyed by the Portuguese in the 15th century. French ethnologist André Adam wrote in the 1970s that it was not known for sure whether there had been Jews living in Anfa, but when Sultan Muḥammad III b. ʿAbd Allāh (1757–1790) installed Haha tribesmen and ʿAbīd al-Bukhāri in the city, which he rebuilt and expanded after the 1755 earthquake, there is no record that he settled Jews in the city as he had done in Mogador.

=== Casablanca ===
According to tradition, the first of the modern Jewish community in Casablanca came from Ben Ahmed near Settat to the south in the Chaouia plain, then under the control of the Mzab tribe. After the reopening of the port of Casablanca for trade in 1831, Jewish merchants in Casablanca, some of whom came from other major cities, traded mostly in grains and wool from the Chaouia. Through European economic penetration, industrial imports from Europe drove traditional Jewish crafts out of the market in Morocco, costing many Jews in the interior their traditional livelihoods. Moroccan Jews started migrating from the interior to coastal cities such as Essaouira, Mazagan, Asfi, and later Casablanca for economic opportunity, participating in trade with Europeans and the development of those cities. Jews settled in the mellah of Casablanca, its Jewish neighborhood, located south of the medina.

Growth of Jewish population in Casablanca
Year	Jewish population	Total population of Casablanca
1831	some	700
1866	1,800	-
1910	5,000	20,000
1926	20,000	-
1936	~40,000	-
1952	74,783	680,000 (nearly 100,000 of whom were French)
1956	~100,000	

A number of Jews in Casablanca, along with some Muslims, became protégés of European states. According to Jean-Louis Cohen, "in this extremely dense walled city, Europeans and Moroccan Jews outnumbered Muslims." Many Jews settled in Casablanca after the visit in 1864 of British Jewish financier and activist Moses Montefiore, who "obtained and negotiated protégé status for Moroccan Jews in certain cities." European powers then "became the guarantors of the Jews who established businesses in Casablanca."

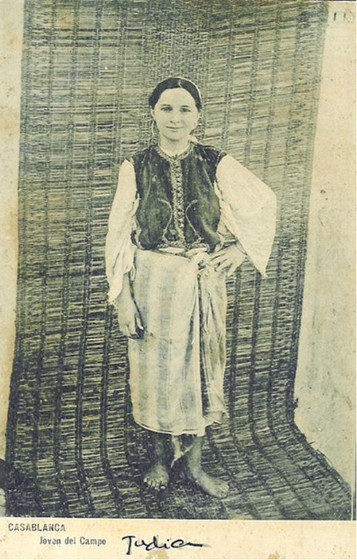
Jewish girl from the countryside of Casablanca, 1910.

In the 1907 bombardment of Casablanca, the beginning of the French invasion of Morocco from the West, the city and especially its mellah, or Jewish quarter, was pillaged after the landing and invasion of French troops. The victims were primarily Jews, though there were also Muslim victims. According to testimony from the director of the school of the Alliance Israélite Universelle:

From the first cannon round, the soldiers of the Makhzen advanced towards the mellah, followed by the general populace, and the looting began. The 5,000–6,000 tribesmen who had been waiting outside the gates entered the city and swept throughout the mellah as well as the medina, stealing, pillaging, raping, killing, and burning... (Note: Original French text: les soldats du Makhzen, dès le premier coup de canon, se précipitent sur le mellah, suivis de la populace, et commencent le pillage. Les 5 à 6 000 hommes des tribus, qui attendaient aux portes, pénètrent en ville, se répandent tant au mellah qu'à la médina, volent, pillent, violent, tuent, incendient...)

In 1907, the Jewish community in Casablanca consisted of about 150 families out of about 350 families in the city in total.

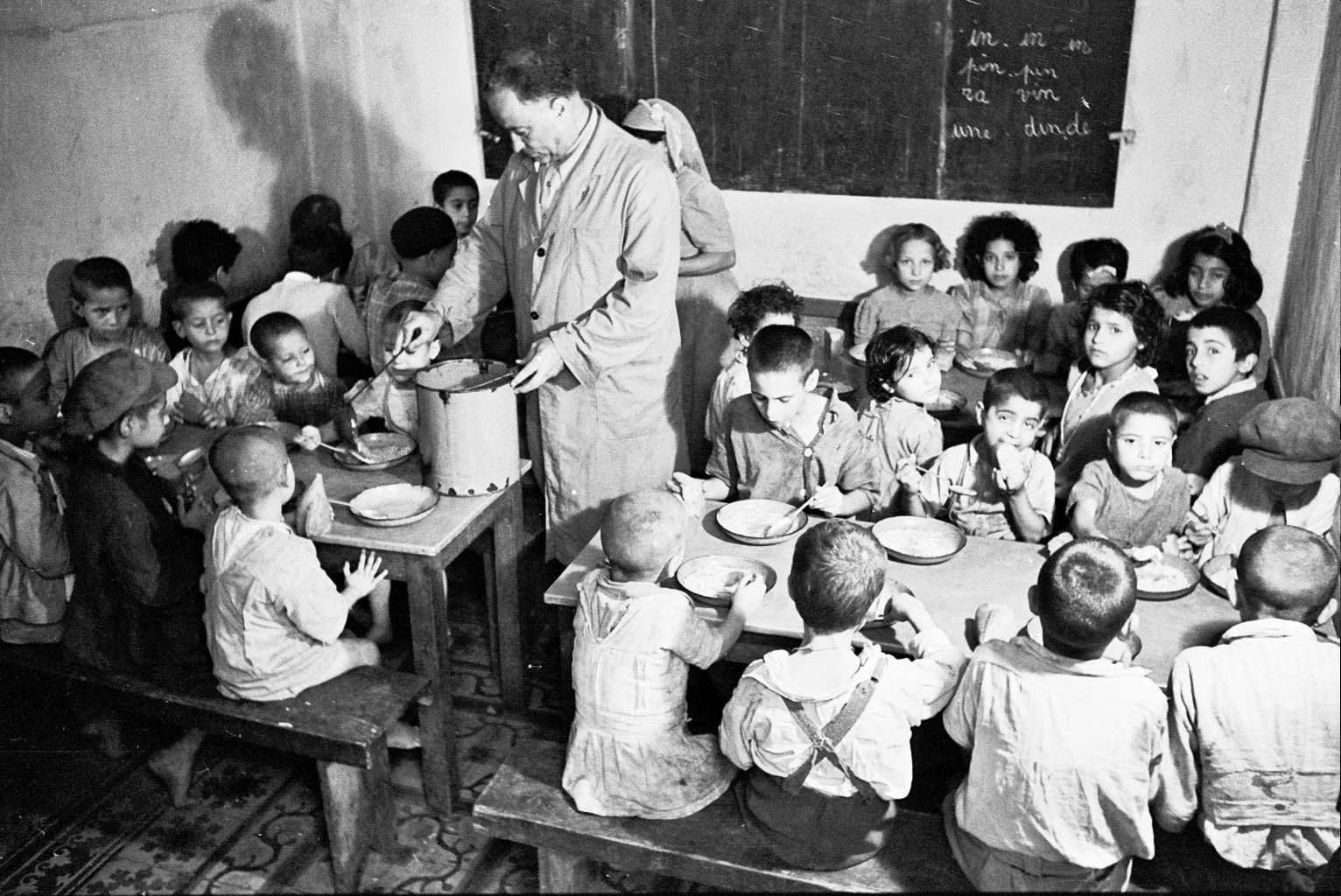
Casablanca Children's Soup Kitchen (1941–1964) in the Casablanca Mellah

The Jewish community in Casablanca was diverse. Sephardi Jews represented a small commercial elite. 'Beidaoui' (بيضاوي 'Casablancan') Jews—those who had been in the city for some generations—had various origins: R'bati Jews settled in the 19th century and dominated the jewelry industry; (Note: Over 8 families including: Amar, El-Baz, Lasry, and Zagoury) Tetuani Jews constituted the Jewish aristocracy in Casablanca, trading initially in dried fruits and perfumes, and benefiting from a practical monopoly on trade with the Spanish. (Note: 8-10 families from Tetuan and Tangier, including: Tetuani, Ettedgui, Benasseraf, Moreno, Benzaquen, Bensabbah, and Toledano.)

There was also a wealthy Gibraltarian family and some Algerians, who benefited from French citizenship. (Note: There were also Moroccans returning from Algeria with French citizenship.) The rest of the Jewish population of Casablanca was made up of Shilha (Note: About 70 families.) and Chaouia tribespeople, representing the lower classes of the mellah and practicing trades including cobbling, mattress making, and pack saddle manufacture.As Jews from around Morocco moved to Casablanca during the French protectorate (1912–1956), they congregated in the mellah. Poor Jews lived in the mellah throughout the protectorate, though Jews were not required to live there and some moved into nearby neighborhoods as they could afford to do so.

=== Spread of Zionism ===
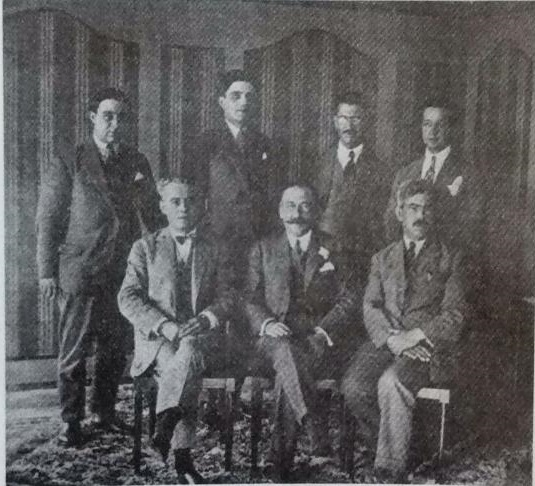
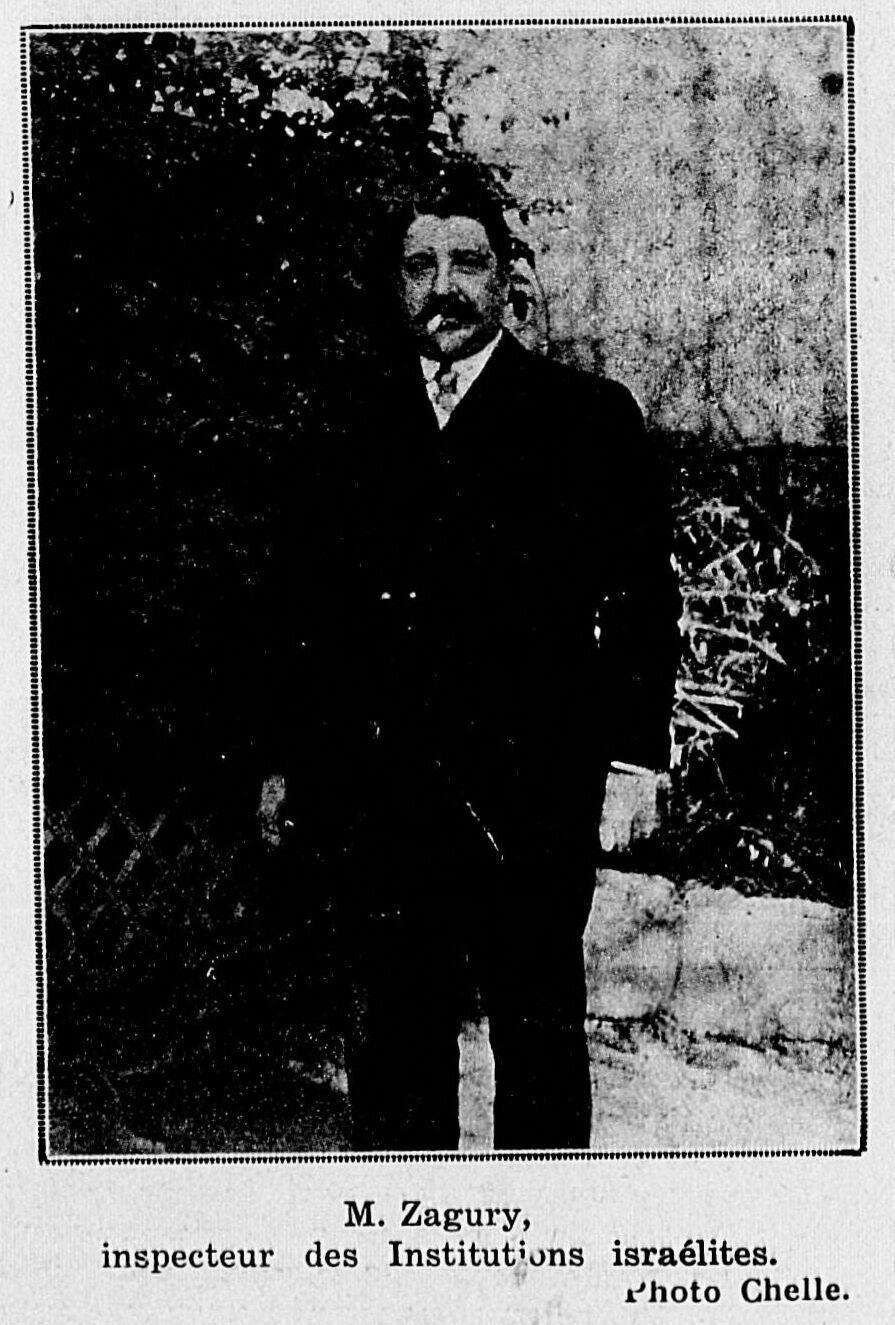
L'Avenir Illustré, a Jewish newspaper with a Zionist editorial line (board members in 1926 pictured on left), clashed with L'Union Marocaine, a Jewish newspaper opposed to Zionism established to represent the alliancistes, graduates of the AIU schools such as Yahia Zagury (right), who opposed Zionism and favored assimilation with the French.

In Casablanca, the Hadida brothers edited Or Ha'Maarav, or La Lumiere du Maroc (1922–1924), a Zionist newspaper printed from 1922 until the French authorities shut it down in 1924, in two versions: one in Judeo-Arabic with Hebrew script and one in French. It was followed by L'Avenir Illustré (1926–1940) a Zionist francophone newspaper, edited by a Polish Jew named Jonathan Thurz. To counter the Zionist press in Morocco, Moroccan Jews associated with the AIU established l'Union Marocaine (1932–1940), a francophone newspaper edited by Élie Nattaf. L'Avenir Illustré and L'Union Marocaine were both shut down by the Vichy regime.

=== World War II and US occupation ===
With the American invasion and presence in Morocco, American Jewish organizations established themselves in Morocco, including the Joint Distribution Committee (JDC), Ozar Hatorah, and the Chabad-Lubavitch group, which opened religious schools in Morocco. Other major external Jewish and Zionist philanthropic organizations, including Œuvre de secours aux enfants (OSE), ORT, and others, implemented a massive aid program for children in the areas of nutrition, health, and education. A large majority of children benefited from this policy, infant mortality decreased, epidemics such as ringworm, trachoma, and tuberculosis declined dramatically, and a large number of children were enrolled in school. Small structures created by private initiatives, especially by the Zionist advocate Samuel-Daniel Levy and financially supported by the international organizations, have included Talmud Torah, Lubavitcher, Ozar Hatorah, Em Habanim, La Maternelle, Casablanca Children's Soup Kitchen, which have contributed to the effort.

After the war, Yahia Zagury assumed the presidency of the committee of the Jewish community of Casablanca and held the post until his death in 1959.

=== Cadima and ha-Misgeret ===
Through Caisse d’Aide aux Immigrants Marocains or Cadima (Hebrew: קדימה, 'forward'), an apparatus administered by the Jewish Agency and Mossad Le'Aliyah that clandestinely arranged and oversaw the mass migration of Moroccan Jews to Israel from 1949 to 1956, approximately 28,000 Moroccan Jews from throughout Morocco emigrated through Casablanca. Its headquarters were in an office in Casablanca and it operated a transit camp, located along the road between Casablanca and al-Jadida, from which Jewish migrants would depart for Israel via Marseille.

In 1955, the Mossad, especially David Ben-Gurion and Isser Harel, established ha-Misgeret (המסגרת 'The Framework'), a clandestine, underground Zionist militia and organization in Morocco headed by Shlomo Havilio ('Louis'). Its agents were European and Israeli Jews, and it served as Mossad's base in Morocco. An 'ulpan' kindergarten for teaching Hebrew established 1954 by Yehudit Galili, an envoy of the Jewish Agency, in a villa in Casablanca's French quarter, would serve as a hiding place for weapons of ha-Misgeret. Galili herself would join and serve ha-Misgeret as a spy and recruiter. After Moroccan independence in 1956, through an agreement between Isser Harel of the Mossad and Shlomo Zalman Shragai of the Jewish Agency, the two organizations would organize the clandestine migration of Moroccan Jews by land and by sea.

Al Wifaq was created January 1956, shortly before the end of the French protectorate, by members of Istiqlal Party and the Democratic Independence Party to foster nationalist sentiment among Moroccan Jews and to discourage them from emigrating to Israel. It was announced in the chamber of commerce of Casablanca, a center of Jewish activity, before opening chapters in other cities including Rabat, Meknes, Fes, and Asfi.

=== Migrants to Casablanca ===
Casablanca also received many Jewish internal migrants from elsewhere in Morocco who stayed in the city. Some wealthy merchants of Andalusi heritage, coming from cities such as Mogador (Essaouira) or Marrakesh, had been trading with Europeans for centuries and represented a small elite. Many others, who joined Casablanca's growing Jewish working class, especially in manufacturing jobs, came from small towns and rural communities further south. There were also around 11,500 Jews from outside Morocco living in the city by 1947, representing 15% of the Jewish population of Casablanca. As Moroccan Jews emigrated, by 1960, Casablanca was home to 45% of the Jews in Morocco.

In the 1950s, under Michel Écochard, the French Protectorate began building Jewish housing in the El Hank neighborhood.

=== Operation Mural ===
From his office in Casablanca, British political activist David Littman led a clandestine mission assisted by the Mossad to illegally transport 530 Jewish Moroccan children from Morocco to Israel in the summer of 1961, under the guise of their attending a summer camp in Switzerland.

=== Operation Yachin ===
Casablanca then became a departure point in Operation Yachin, the covert Mossad-organized migration operation from 1961 to 1964.

=== Nowadays ===
In 1956 there were 100,000 Jews registered in Casablanca. In 2018 it was estimated that there were only 2,500 Moroccan Jews living in Casablanca, while according to the World Jewish Congress there were only 1,000 Moroccan Jews remaining.

Today, the Jewish cemetery of Casablanca is one of the major cemeteries of the city, and many synagogues remain in service, but the city's Jewish community has dwindled. The Moroccan Jewish Museum is a museum established in the city in 1997.

=== 2003 attacks ===
In the Islamist attacks in Casablanca in 2003, several places related to the Jewish community were attacked, among other targets.

== Jewish institutions ==
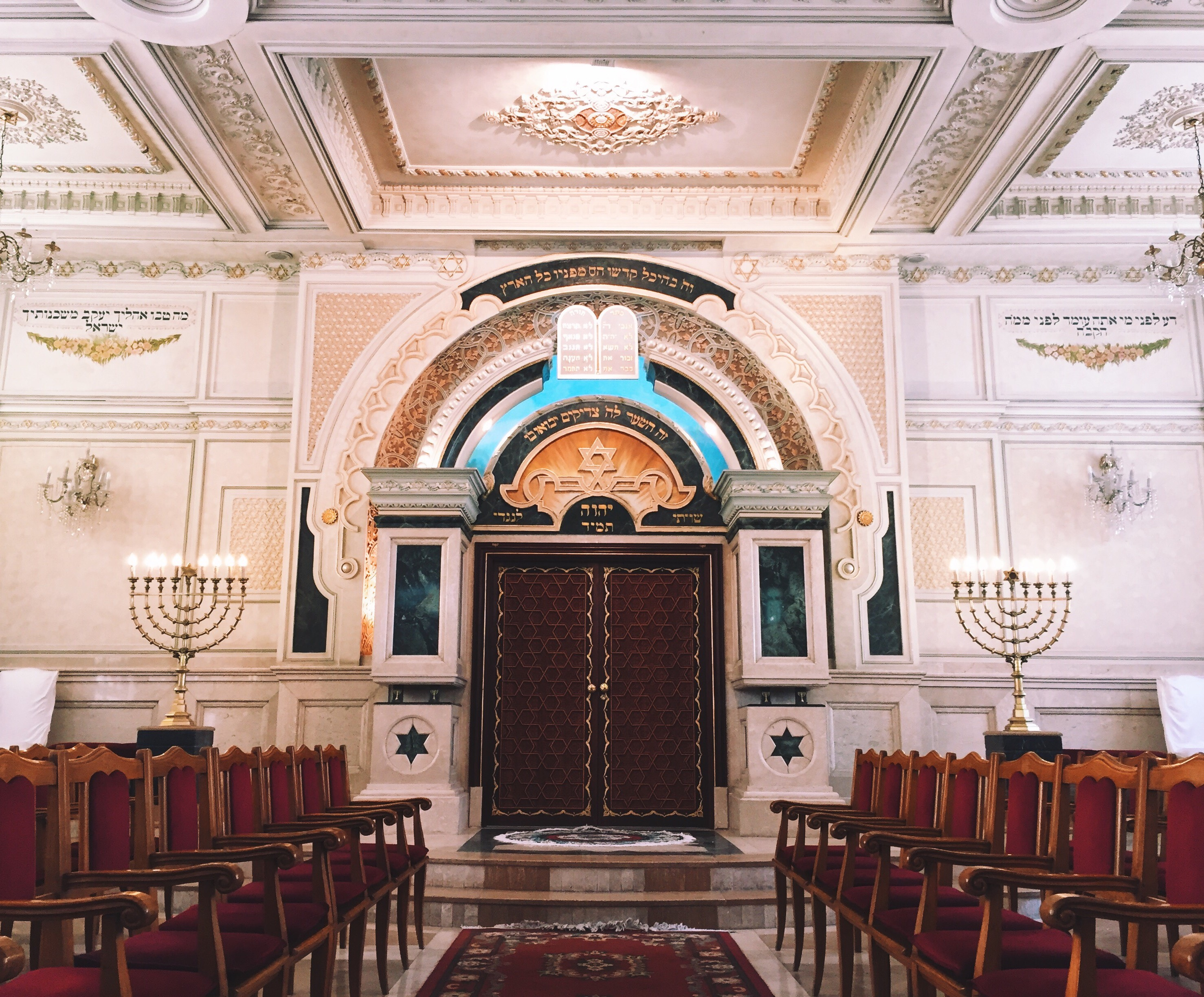
Temple Beth-El, also referred to as Le Temple Algérien, was established in 1949 by Algerian Jewish immigrants.

=== Synagogues ===
Casablanca had over 80 synagogues. Among these, there are the Ettedgui Synagogue and Temple Beth-El.

=== Beth din ===
In 1918, in Casablanca as in other cities in Morocco, a dahir created a new beth din, or rabbinical court, with jurisdiction restricted to matters of personal status and religion. Ḥayyim Bensoussan led Casablanca's rabbinical court for 23 years. In 1949, Shalom Messas assumed this position until moving to Israel in 1978.

== Education ==
The first Alliance Israélite Universelle (AIU) school in Casablanca was established in 1897. There were 295 boys and 161 girls studying in the city's AIU schools by 1901, and enrollment increased dramatically during the protectorate, under which the AIU was the "quasi-official Jewish school system".

The École Normale Hébraïque was established by the AIU in 1945 in the Oasis neighborhood as a teacher-training school and secondary school with a curriculum teaching modern Hebrew.

== Culture ==
=== Architecture ===
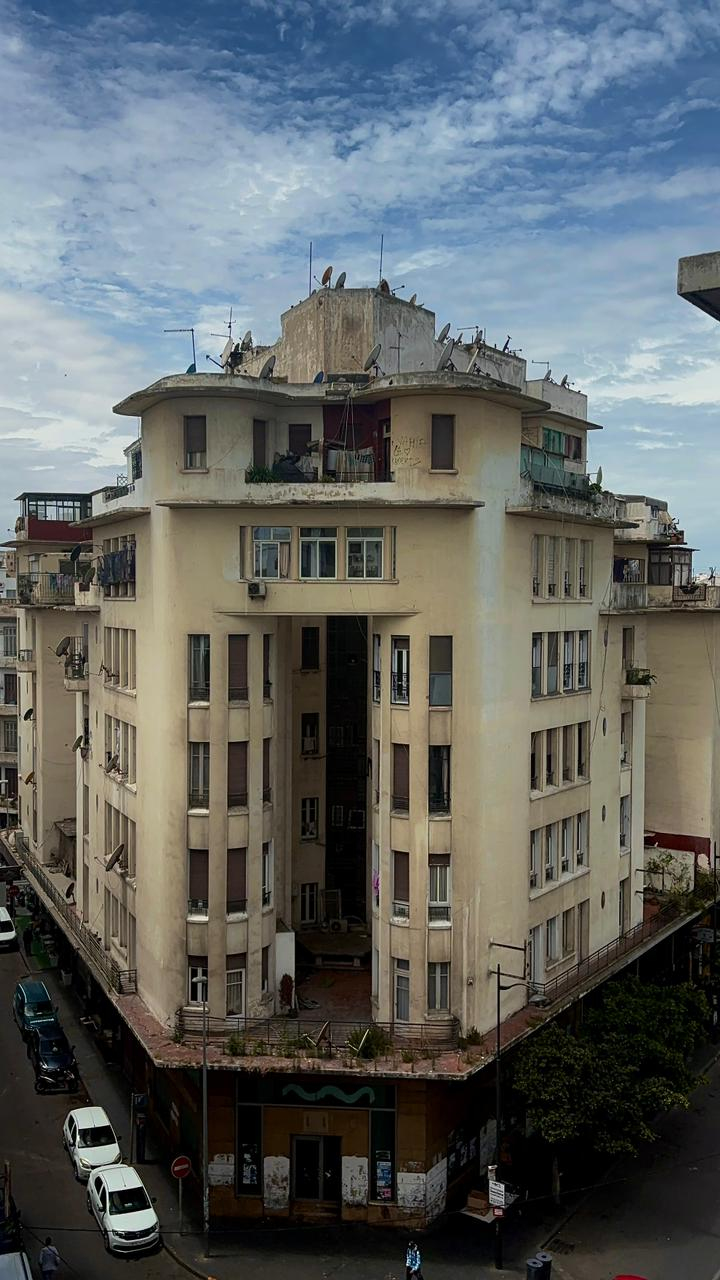
The Lévy-Bendayan Building, designed by Marius Boyer (1928-1929), an example of the numerous high-rise buildings commissioned by Jewish patrons in the interwar period.

Jewish patrons constructed the overwhelming majority of the tallest buildings in Casablanca during the interwar period. In the view of Jean-Louis Cohen, the vertical thrust of construction led by Jewish patrons was "nothing less than a revenge over the [status of] dhimma. Being able to build the highest structures reflected the new condition of a fully emancipated Jewish bourgeoisie."

The Suraqui brothers, Joseph and Elias, were notable architects in Casablanca. They came from a Gibraltarian Jewish family that moved to Algeria, where they were trained as surveyors. They contributed to the art deco and streamline moderne villas and apartment buildings in the city.

Elie Azagury (1918–2009), director of Groupe des Architectes Modernes Marocains (GAMMA) after Moroccan independence in 1956, is considered the first Moroccan modernist architect.

=== Music ===
In 1949, the Algerian singer Salim Halali moved from Paris to Casablanca, bought an old café in Maârif, the cosmopolitan quarter of Casablanca, and transformed it into a prestigious cabaret, Le Coq d'Or. It was frequented by wealthy Moroccans and visiting dignitaries, including King Farouk of Egypt, and it was where Haja El Hamdaouia sang. From 1950, he formed a duo with the Moroccan musician Haim Botbol, covering a number of Maghrebi classics. Raymonde El Bidaouia, a singer of chaabi, is from Casablanca.

Samy Elmaghribi recorded and performed in Casablanca and established Samyphone, his own record label in the city in 1955.

LD Malca is a celebrated musician from Casablanca and has been described as "Le roi de la Pop au Maroc [the king of pop in Morocco]."

=== Literature ===
The writer Edmond Amran El Maleh, originally from Asfi, was active in Casablanca until he fled the Morocco of Hassan II following the riots of March 1965. Political activist, essayist, and editor Abraham Serfaty joined the editorial board of the literary magazine Souffles-Anfas in 1968.

== Representations in art ==
=== Film ===
Laïla Marrakchi's 2005 film Marock about upper-class teenagers in Casablanca features a Moroccan Jewish protagonist named Youri (Matthieu Boujenah) who falls in love with Rita (Morjana Alaoui), a Muslim woman. Mohamed Ismaïl's 2008 film Adieu, Mères is about Jewish and Muslim families in Casablanca amid the mass emigration of Moroccan Jews in the early 1960s, at the time of the Pisces Affair. Nabil Ayouch's 2017 film Razzia features a Jewish restaurateur named Joe (Arieh Worthalter).
