= École normale =

École normale or École Normale may refer to:

- École normale supérieure (Paris), called École normal until 1846, a university-level institution
- Normal school, English translation of French école normale, typically designating a teacher-training school
- École normale supérieure (disambiguation), bodies derived from the Paris institution
- École Normale de Musique de Paris, a music conservatory
- École normale catholique, or lycée Blomet, a private secondary school in Paris
- École Normale Hébraïque, a Jewish secondary school in Casablanca, Morocco

== See also ==
- Grande école, a class of prestigious specialised universities in France
