= Ettedgui =

Ettedgui is a Moroccan surname.

- David Ettedgui (born 1974), Canadian sports commentator
- Joseph Ettedgui (1936–2010), Moroccan fashion retailer
- Herman Ettedgui (1917–2012), Venezuelan athlete
- Marco Antonio Ettedgui (1958–1981), Venezuelan artist
- Norman Ettedgui (1939–2024), Venezuelan writer
- Peter Ettedgui, British film maker, son of Joseph

== See also ==
- Ettedgui Synagogue, a synagogue in Casablanca, Morocco
