= Jacques Cotta =

French politician (1908–1971)

Mayor of Nice
- In office 1945–1947
- Preceded by: Virgile Barel
- Succeeded by: Jean Médecin

Personal details
- Born: 1908 Nice, France
- Died: 1971 (aged 62–63) Nice, France
- Party: SFIO
- Children: Michèle Cotta; Alain Cotta
- Occupation: Politician; French Resistance fighter Journalist; Lawyer

Jacques Cotta (1908–1971) was a French politician, lawyer and journalist. He was a member of the SFIO party. He served as Mayor of Nice from 1945 to 1947. He was elected mayor of Nice in 1945 against the communist Virgile Barel. He was also member of the French Resistance. He lost the municipal election of 1947 during which Jean Médecin won.

== Biography ==
Jacques Cotta was born in Nice, France on 1908 and died in Nice, France on 1971. Jacques Cotta was married and has two children's.

Political offices
Preceded by Virgile Barel	Mayor of Nice; 1945 – 1947	Succeeded by Jean Médecin
