= Casablanca Children's Soup Kitchen =

Child day care center in Casablanca, 1941–1964

Soup Kitchen (La Soupe Populaire) (SP)
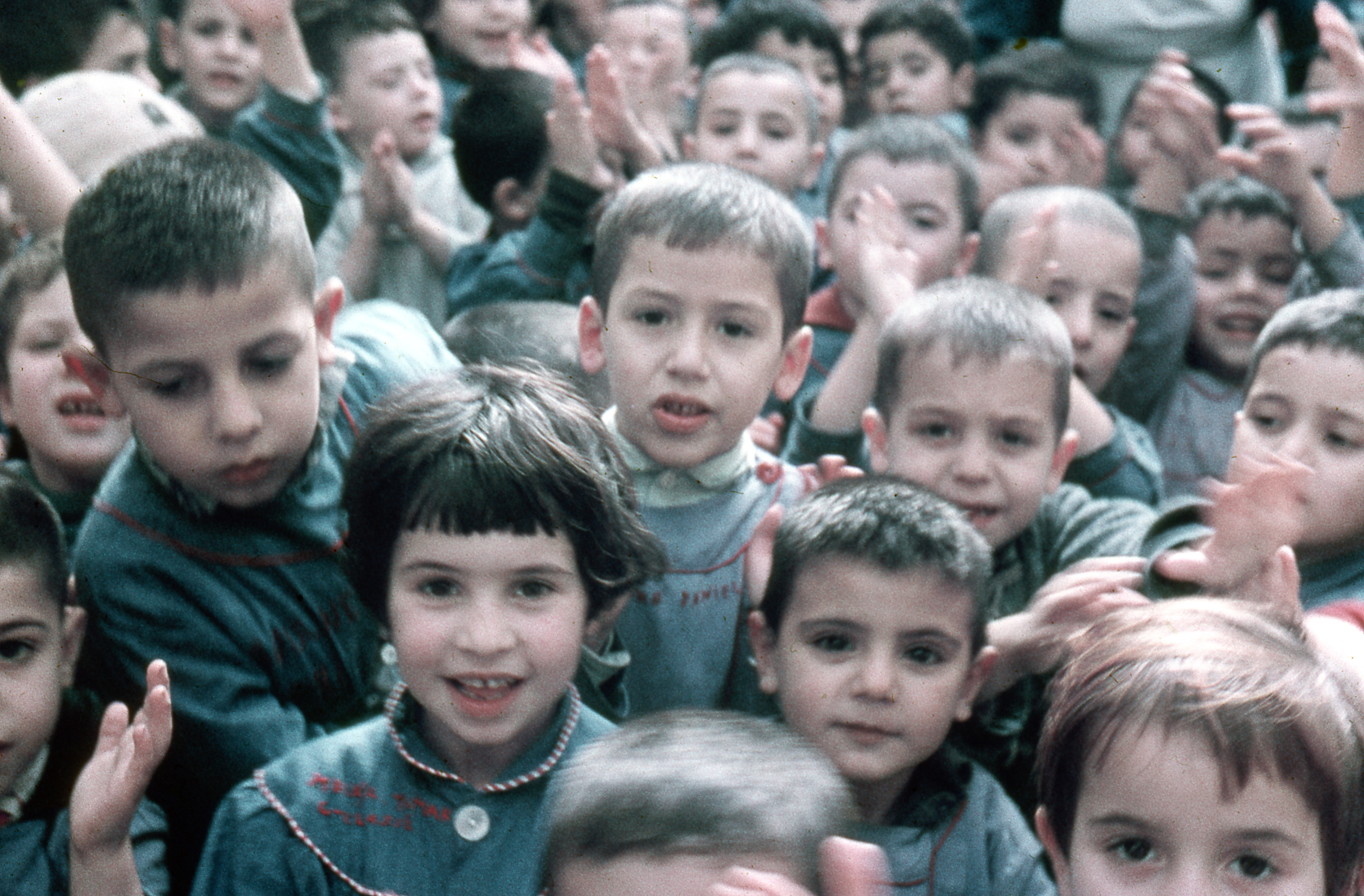
- Formation: 1941–1964
- Founder: Elias Suraqui
- Type: Philanthropic institution for children
- Region served: Casablanca, Morocco
- Services: Nutrition and Instruction
- Website: https://www.instagram.com/la_soupe_populaire_casablanca

The Casablanca Children's Soup Kitchen (La Soupe Populaire pour Enfants; SP) was a children's soup kitchen in the Mellah (Jewish quarter) of Casablanca, Morocco. Founded in 1941 by local architect Elias Suraqui, the organization operated until 1964. The institution was financed and supported from the year 1948 by the American Jewish Joint Distribution Committee (JOINT or JDC), the Alliance Israélite Universelle (AIU), l'Œuvre de secours aux enfants (OSE), and private donors as well.

During its years of operation, approximately 6,000 children were supported and educated within the SP's framework. The staff consisted of a director and a dozen teachers, cooks, nurses and part-time or full-time educators.

== Context ==
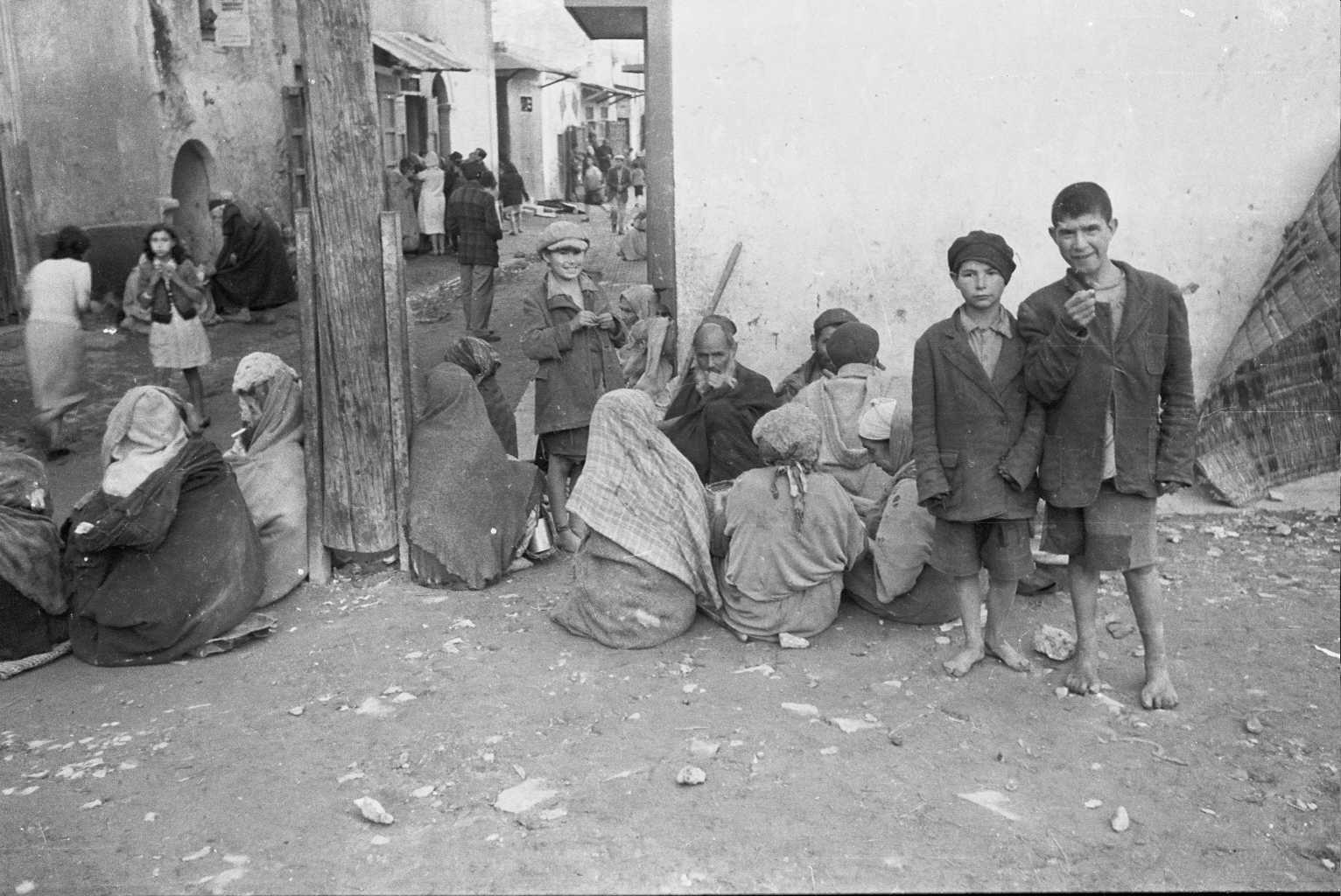
Mellah of Casablanca

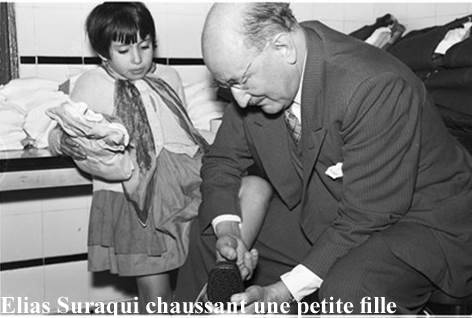

In 1941, with 40,000 inhabitants, the Mellah of Casablanca was the most populated in Morocco. Poverty was deep; families lived huddled together in a single room, with children in rags and often without shoes. Chronic malnutrition and epidemics were rampant especially among children who suffered from ringworm, trachoma and tuberculosis due to crowded living conditions. The situation regarding children malnutrition was alarming. The following anecdote illustrates the reality: in 1951 a journalist, Lawrence Resner, reported that the 300 children at the soup kitchen were given tags and were entitled to one meal a day. About 30 other children, without tags, waited outside in the hope of receiving a ration if there was any left over, and another child, who had not found a place in the queue, waited even longer outside. He waited for hours; sometimes he received a last ration and often was left empty-handed.

The French authorities under the Vichy rule were not inclined to finance a partial transfer of this Jewish population to salubrious dwellings in the European neighborhood. Even after the war, they focused primarily on the construction of cheap housing in the European city with the aim of accommodating Moroccan workers from the countryside, whom the city badly needed for its development. As for Jewish organizations, until 1945, they concentrated their efforts on Holocaust survivors. It was only in the late 1940s that they started addressing the issue. From 1940 to 1960 internal immigration to Morocco occurred. The Jewish population in the countryside moved to large cities, mainly Casablanca, thus contributing to an increase in the urban population. In 1960, the census of the Jewish population in Morocco was as follows:

Population Juive Marocaine	160,032
Jewish Population Casablanca	71,175
Jews of foreign nationality	20,000
Total Jewish population in Morocco	180,032

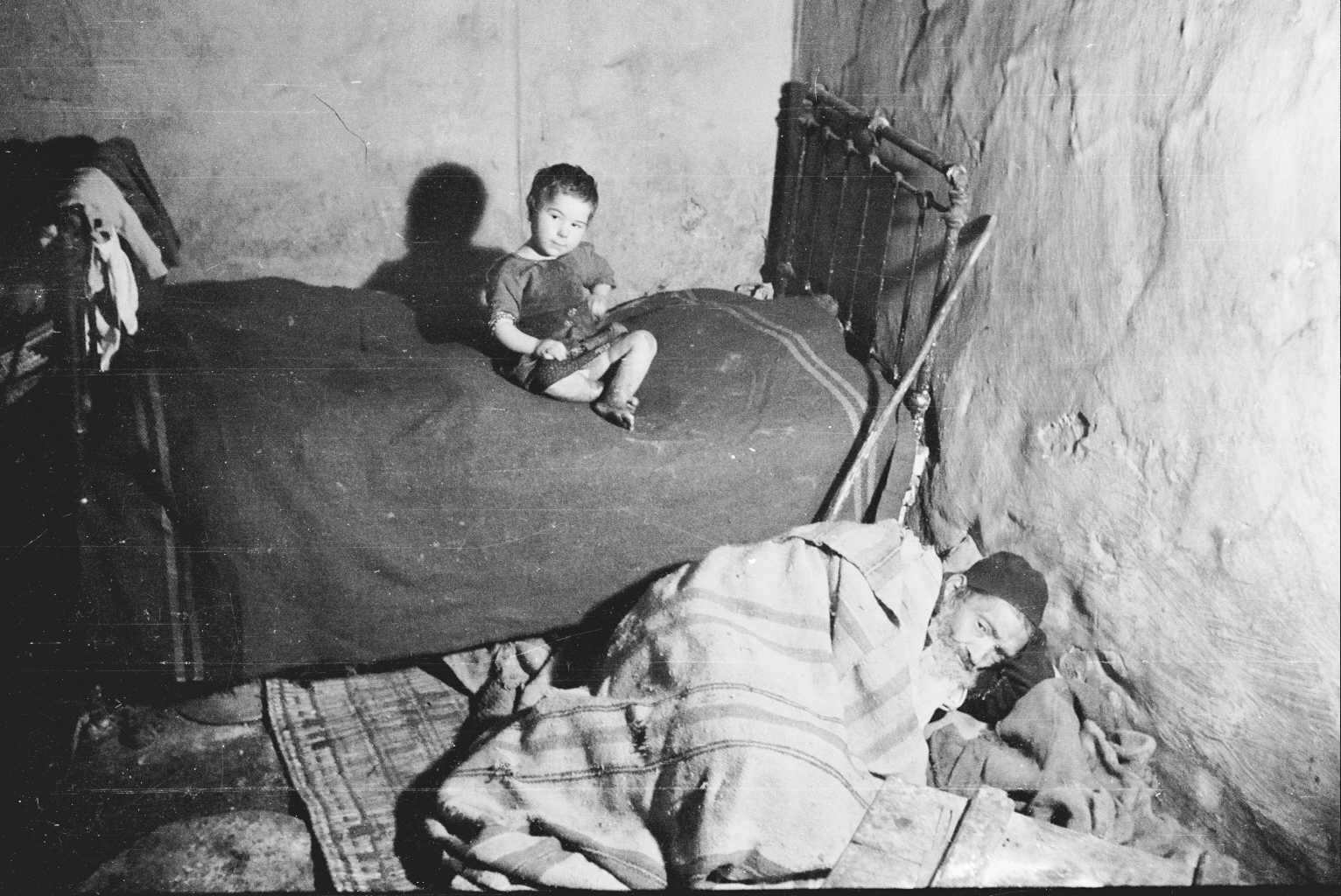
Picture of Mellah, Casablanca (1940)

The Casablanca agglomeration comprised about 45% of the Jewish population among them 40,000 Jews living in the Mellah.

=== The Hedarim (Children's Study Classes) ===
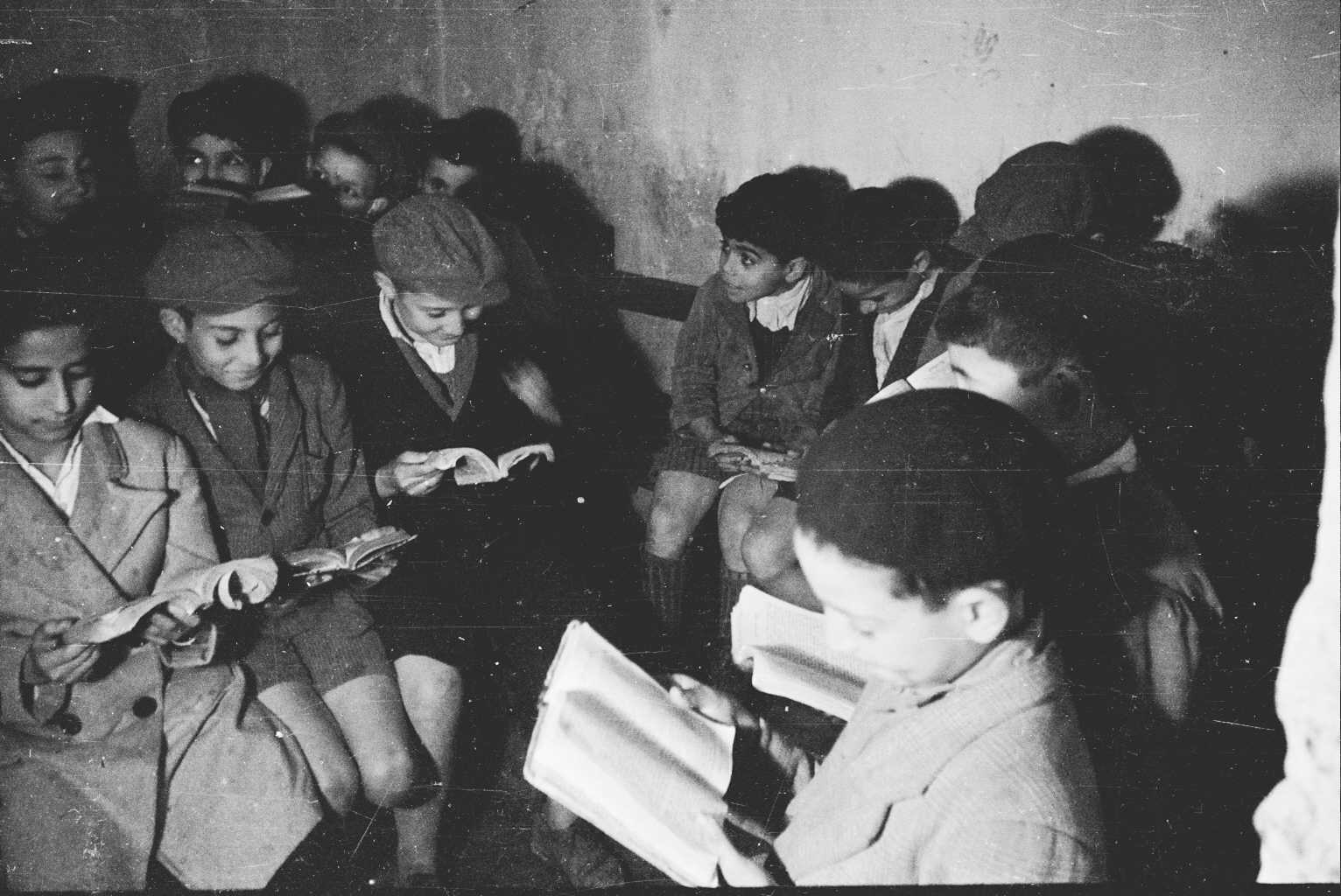
Heder mellah Casablanca 1942

In 1941, the only structures in the Mellah that dealt with children were the hedarim, also known as Cheder. These were closed rooms, with no ventilation, no furniture, often without windows. The young children (usually boys) were huddled together under the guidance of an adult instructor who taught them the Hebrew alphabet and prayers. Every Mellah in Morocco (or elsewhere) has his Cheder, even in the most remote corners of the Atlas Mountains where the Jewish communities had none or very few contact with the outside. The hedarim existence is a Jewish specificity that has endured throughout history. This singularity meant that for centuries, illiteracy, at least as far as men were concerned, did not exist among the Jews. From the end of the 1940s, Jewish organizations, led by the JOINT, fought hard against the hedarim institution, as the hedarim contributed to the spread of contagious diseases that ravaged the Mellah. In 1948, an internal Joint report stated, “The eventual plan is to remove about 2,000 children from the Hedarim of the Mellah and to give them decent nursery care during the day” The JOINT thus supported alternative structures (Talmud Torah, Lubawitch, SP and others) which would be able to compete with the hedarim. In 1952, the JOINT expressly asked these organizations to integrate children from the hedarim as an absolute priority. This policy finally paid off. At the end of 1952, there were no more hedarim in the Mellah of Casablanca.

== Historical ==
=== 1941–1947 ===
The initiative for the SP creation started in 1941, when population growth in the Casablanca Mellah was raising concerns over poor hygiene and undernutrition conditions. Few documents remain of the SP first period; the number of children benefiting from the canteen at this time is unknown. Its goal was to provide hot meals as well as to educate underprivileged young Jewish children between the ages of 6 and 8. The SP received 300 children per year . At the very beginning, only one teacher was hired and only a single class of thirty children was in operation There are few press articles, about fifty photographic shots, photos of charity balls in which money collections took place as well as some shots of benefactors. They were wealthy Jewish donors from Casablanca. Armand Tordjman was the first director and Mr. Elbaz was the accountant. Some assistants and cooks were also hired. Merchants of the central food market in Casablanca donated surpluses and sold food at reduced prices. The Civil Region (of Casablanca) provided coupons for fabrics, which were cut free of charge by Jewish tailoring companies and volunteers distributed the clothes. Millers provided flour at low cost, with which a baker made bread for free. In 1941, when the SP was established, Jewish structures capable of integrating the children of the Mellah were not equipped to meet the needs. These structures: the JOINT, ORT, Alliance Israélite Universelle, OSE, and others were more active in the following years. After Morocco's independence in 1956, the Jewish population of the Mellah gradually left the ghetto, which became depopulated.

The SP was located in a dead end of the Mellah of Casablanca at 113 boulevard du 2e tirailleurs (currently bd Tahar el Alaoui). The premises were cramped, two classrooms which alternately served as a refectory for the canteen, an office, a playground and the dead end itself where outdoor activities were carried out. In the following two decades, there were some expansions, but the layout of the premises changed little. Throughout its history, the SP has suffered from overcrowded premises.

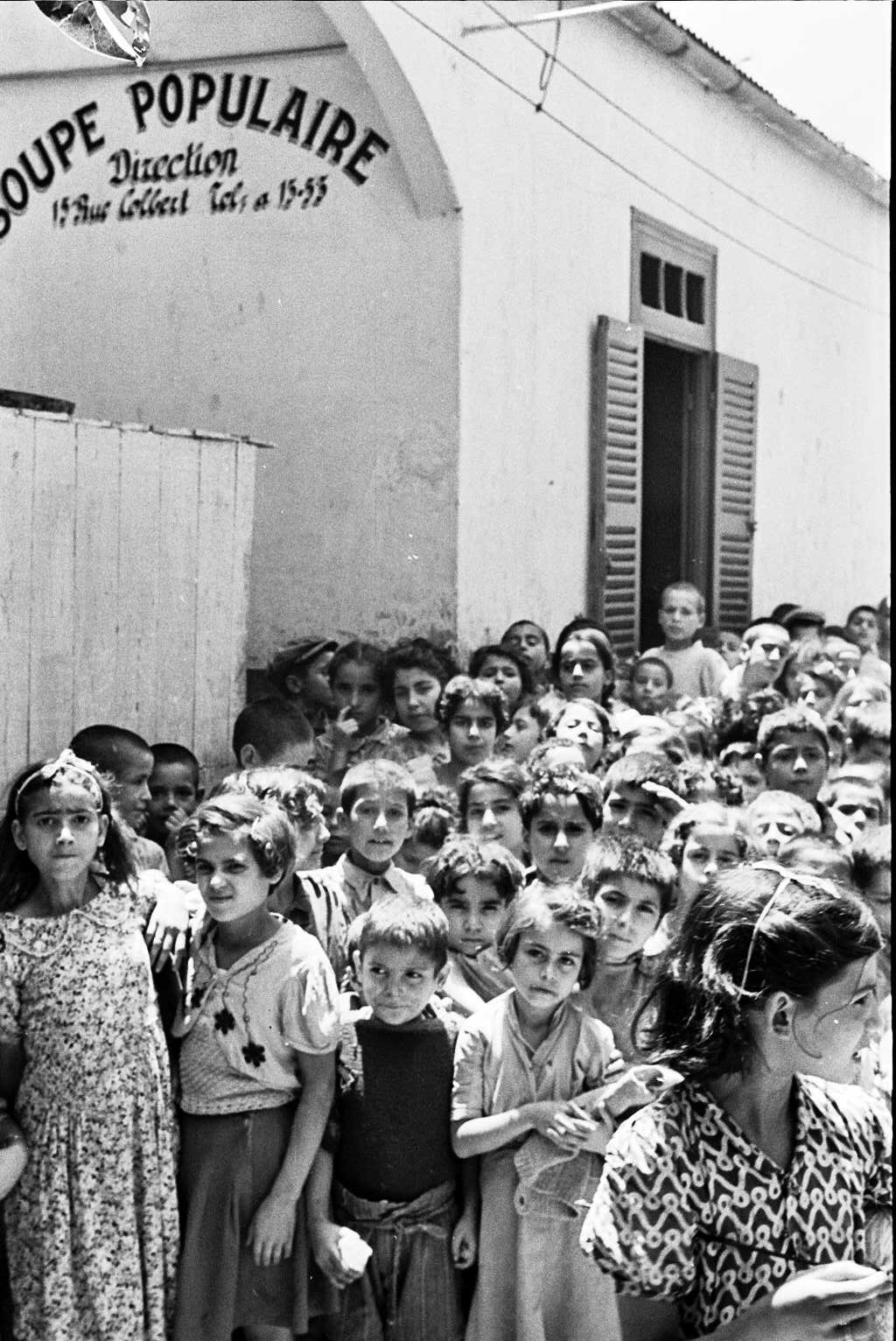
Soup Kitchen entrance

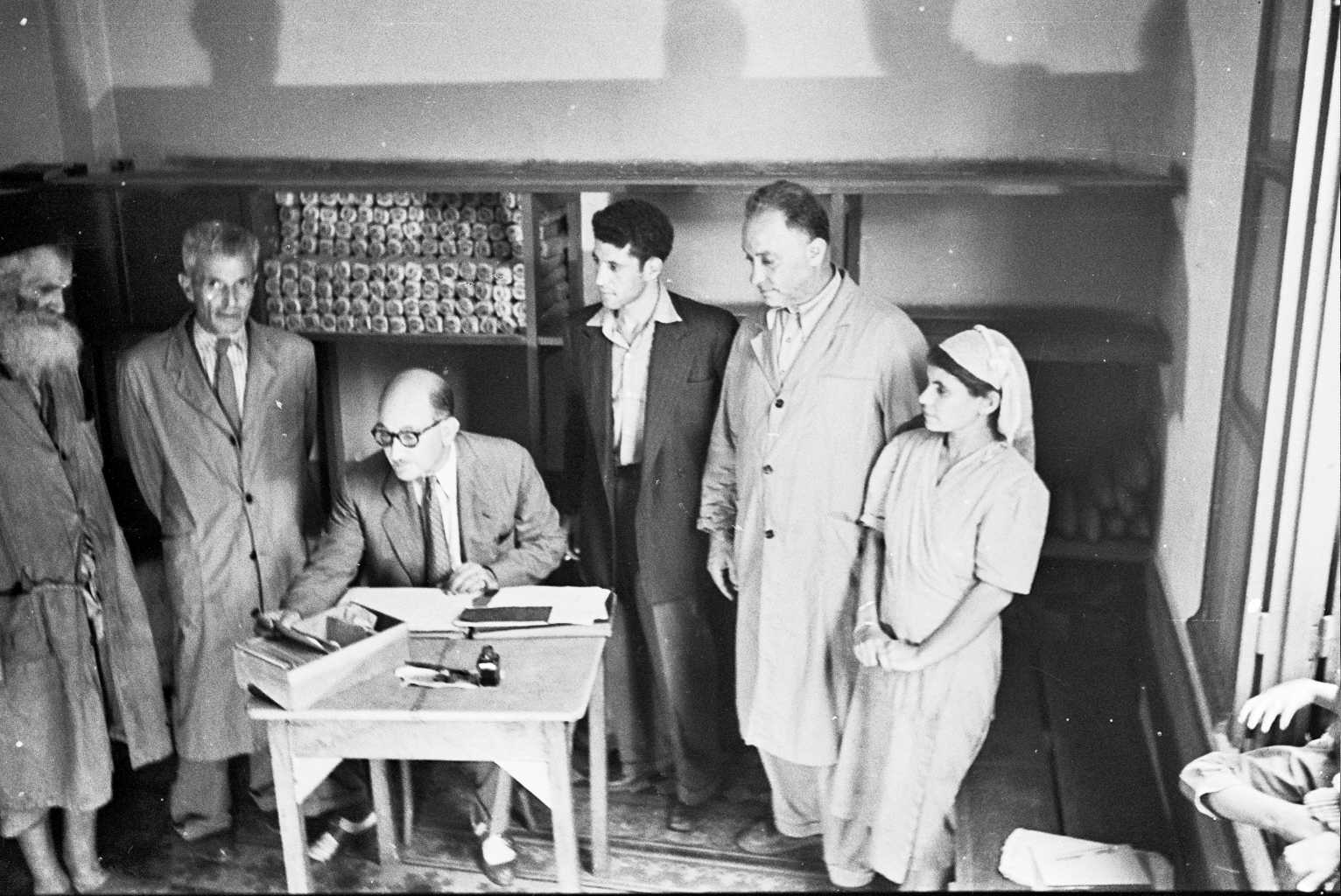
President and assistants 1942

=== 1948–1964 ===
From 1948 on, there was some immigration to Israel, but its magnitude was less than the natural population increase. In addition, a number of Jews immigrated from the Mellahs located in the periphery to the Casablanca Mellah, which exacerbated the latter's demographic problem. In the immediate post-World War II period, Jewish philanthropic organizations focused on Europe to provide support and aid to Holocaust survivors. However, from the early 1950s onwards, international Jewish organizations began to direct their efforts towards the Jewish populations in Moslem countries. The main Jewish organization, JOINT, devoted considerable financial resources, set up administrative structures capable of supporting a policy of aid and employed hundreds of experts as advisors in health, nutrition, education, financial organization and in monitoring investments. With regards to Morocco, the JOINT realized that the task was too large and that the organization would have to set some specific goals. In the late 1940s, the strategic decision to focus on childhood was implemented. In 1948, the JOINT agreed to collaborate and support the SP (and virtually all the other similar existing institutions for children) because these projects were in line with its overall strategy. This collaboration only increased over the years. The JOINT supported many children's institutions in Casablanca, mainly:

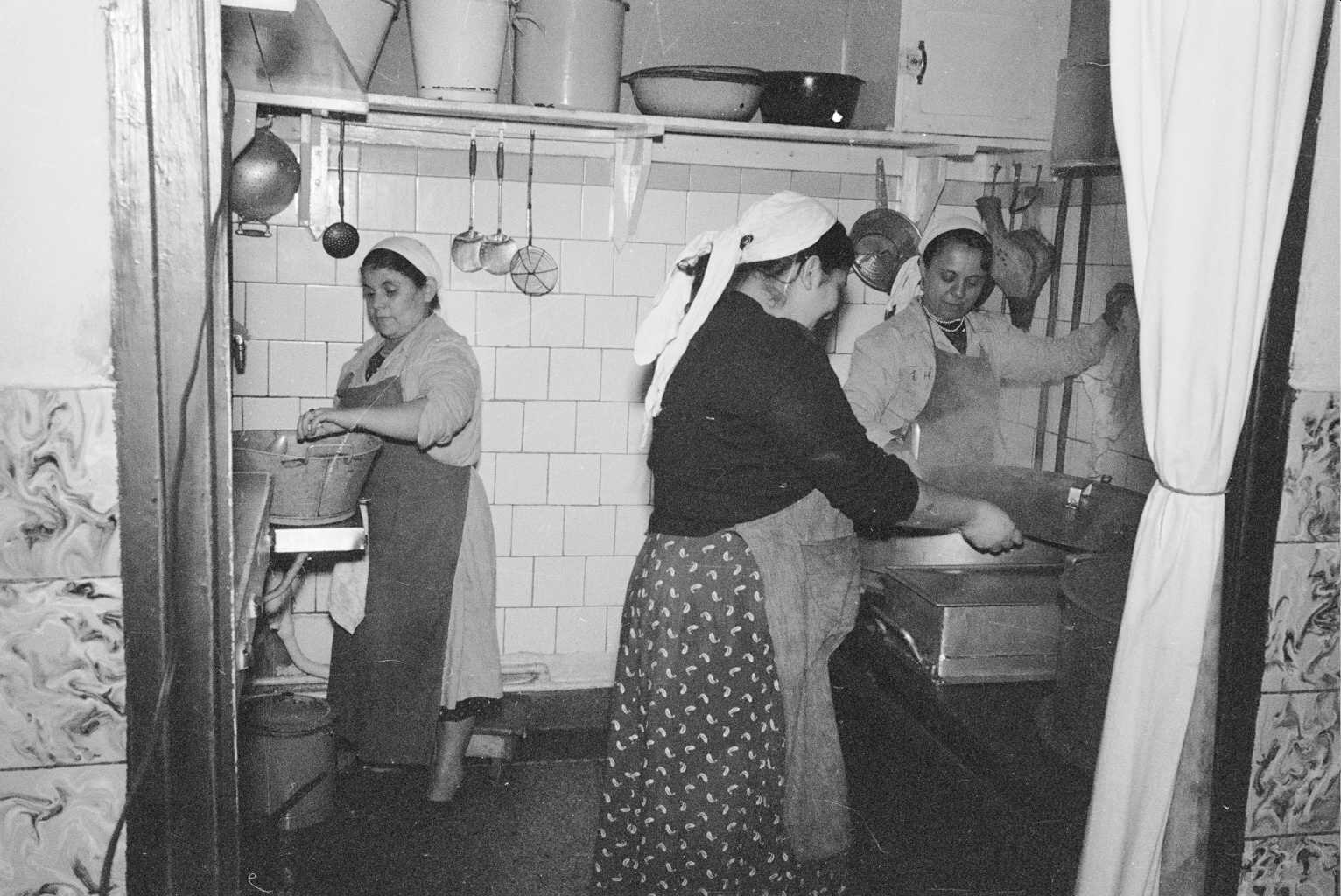
Cooks in the 1950s

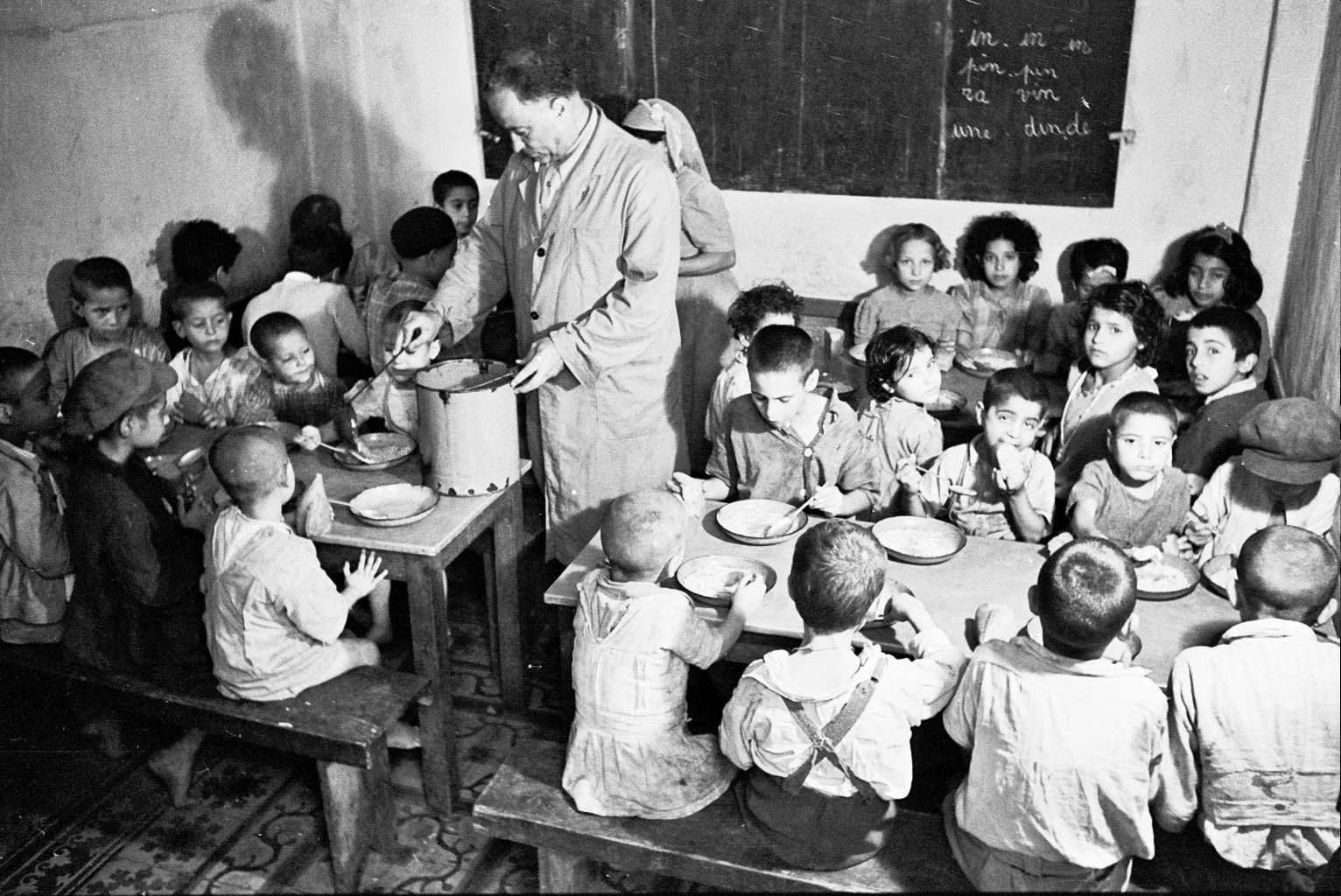
Canteen / Classroom 1940s

Talmud Torah	1400 enfants
Lubavitcher	780 enfants
Ozar Hatorah	630 enfants
Em Habanim	350 enfants
La Maternelle	350 enfants
Soup Kitchen	300 enfants
Finzi day care center (AIU)	185 enfants

== Statutes and nomenclature ==
A director appointed by the president and the committee headed SP. His role was to monitor accounting as well as the proper functioning of kitchens and classrooms, ensure the supply of products used in catering, manage stocks, negotiate with suppliers, place orders, and to receive goods. The JOINT controlled his activities, directed its criticisms and suggestions to the president who was ultimately responsible for the SP functioning and who in turn gave instructions to the director. In the 50s and 60s the directors were Mr. Cohen and Mr. Teboul. In 1959, three years after Moroccan independence, the SP changed its statutes to adapt to the new legislation on humanitarian organizations.

== The Joint (JDC) ==
From 1948, the JOINT contribution was decisive The JOINT fully financed the food provided by the SP, which represented the bulk of the total budget. In addition to the running costs of the canteen, the Joint regularly provided foodstuffs, mainly: milk, butter, cheese, oil, dried beans, flour, rice, sugar and jam It sponsored teams of nutritional, generalist and specialist doctors. Medical visits occurred at least three times a year. The JOINT delegated many experts responsible for verifying the smooth running of the SP management, and the use of the allocated funds. Its administrators constantly sent reports whose conclusions and recommendations were reported to the SP management. From time to time, the JOINT was pleased with the progress made. For example, in the 1958 annual report, one could read:

‘In the Soupe Populaire d'Enfants, many constructive changes were brought about. A new infirmary has been established, and what previously served that purpose was made available for preparing and cleaning vegetables, thus ensuring a greater degree of cleanliness and facilitating the work of the kitchen staff. New equipment of a work-saving nature, and at the same time conducive to cleanliness, has been purchased. One of the classes was transformed into a dining room, which makes it possible to serve meals more efficiently.’

In 1956, the daily cost of the JOINT food contribution was 8938 francs (not including the price of imported food). This sum does not include the costs of experts, travel, etc., it corresponds to approximately $200 (2022 value), i.e$. 6000 per month. In 1957, the annual cost of the canteen was 2,234,750 francs or about 48,000 current $. In 1962, the monthly cost of the canteen was 8981.97 francs and the operating costs 4750 francs, that is to say, a monthly total of $30,400 (2022 value). The JOINT also carried out a distribution of clothes at least once a year. In 1958, the clothing budget for the SP was 957,050 francs ($20,200 of 2022). Every year, the office of the JOINT in Morocco produced an annual report on all its activities. This report was a synthesis of thousands of documents (expertise by specialists, discussions between experts, minutes of debates, accounting reports, health reports, relations with the authorities and many more). The aim of the report was to provide some insights from the past year's activities and recommendations for the following years. These reports showed that the number of SP children fluctuated between 300 and 315, except in 1964 for the last year of operation when the number of children was 210.

Two other Jewish organizations under the aegis and in close collaboration with the JOINT played a leading role in the maintenance and operation of the SP, these are:

=== The Alliance Israélite Universelle (AIU) ===
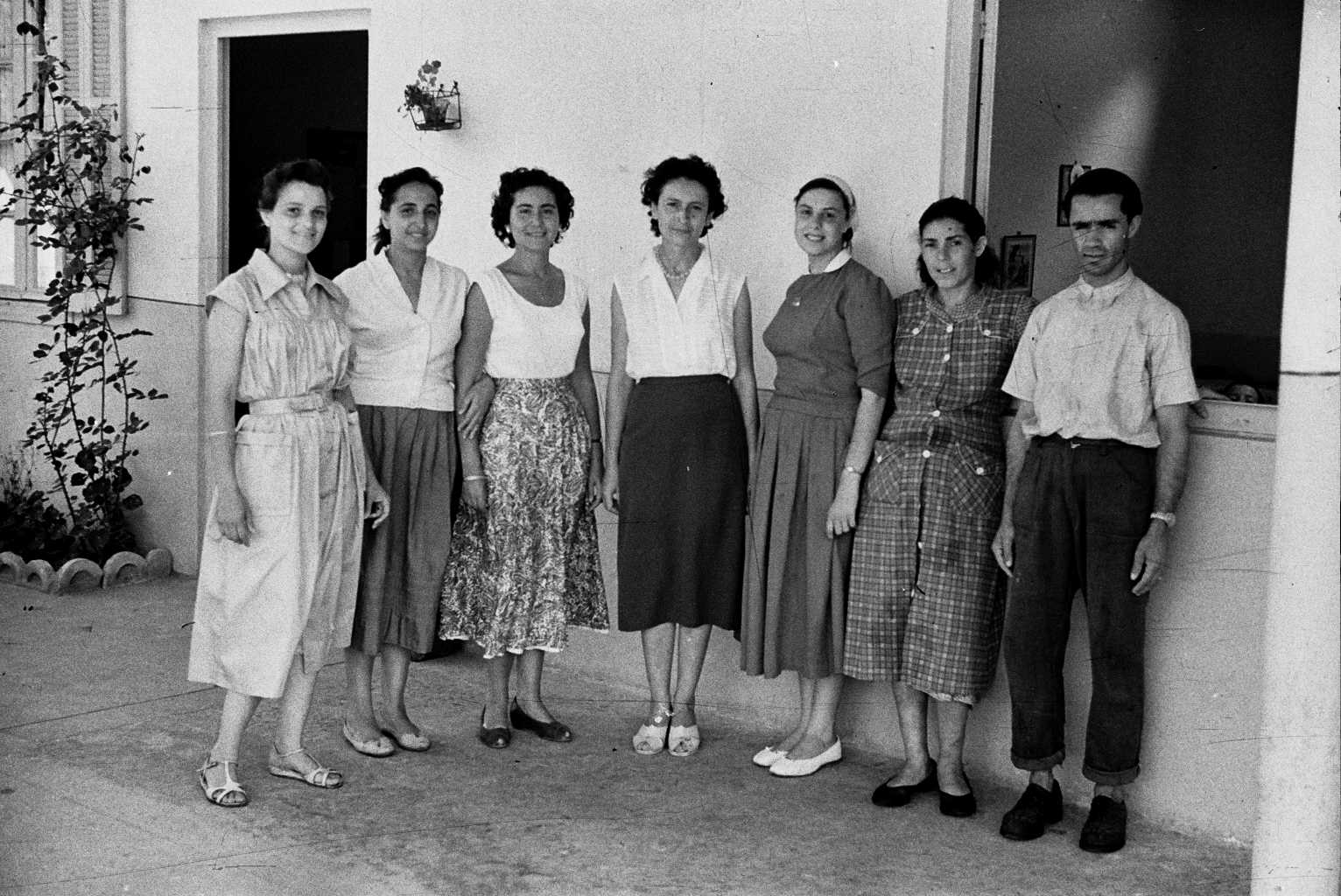
The Headmistress and Teachers

AIU's contribution to the SP educational process was essential It provided the directors, teachers and school assistants, and established the study program. Staff were AIU employees; however, they worked full-time at the SP. For this, the AIU received a partial contribution from the JOINT. The teaching was in two languages, French and Hebrew. Ms. Pérahia who was director of the AIU Ch. Finzi daycare center was one of the last SP's headmistress.

=== The Organisation du Secours à l’Enfance (OSE) ===
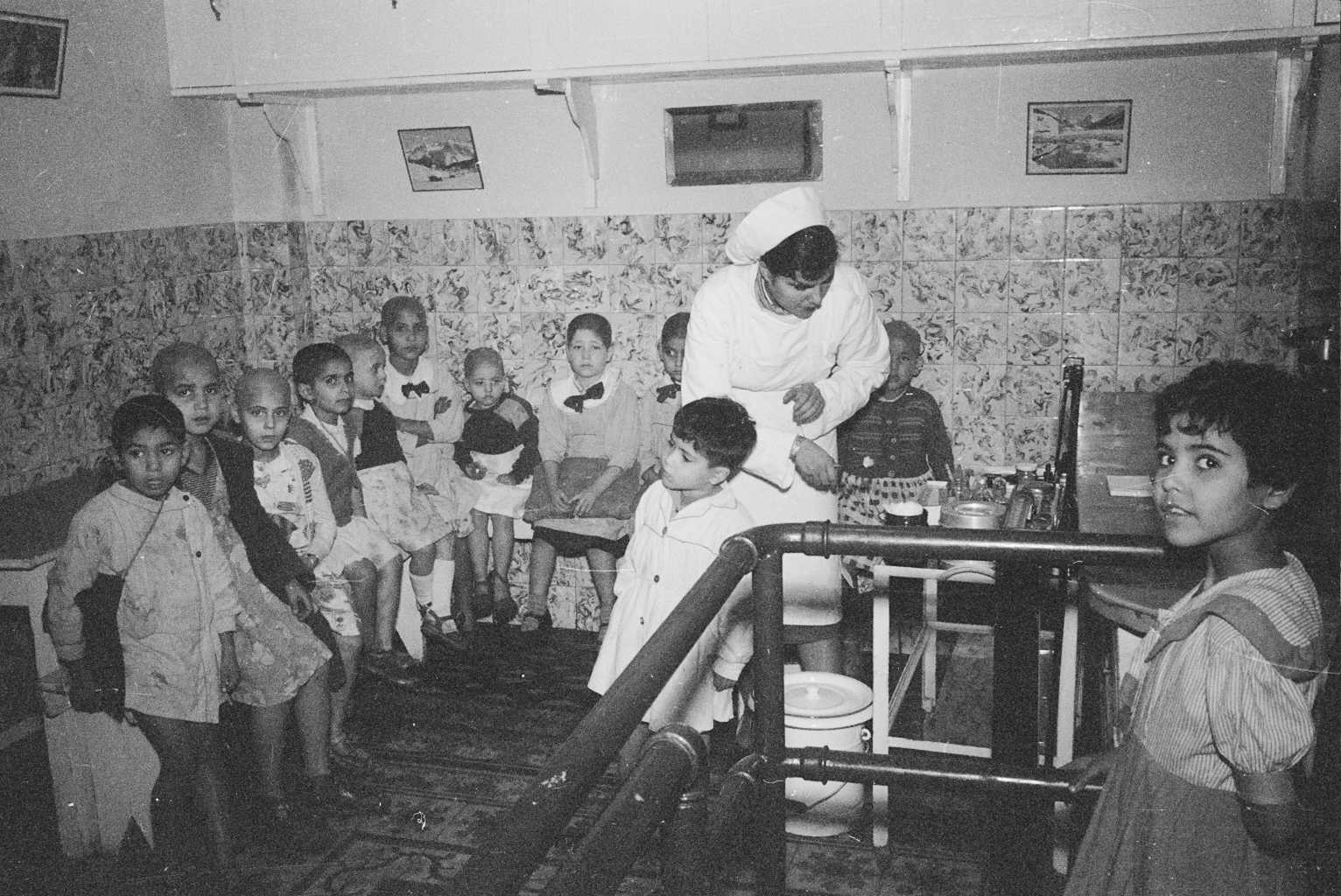
Soup Kitchen nursery in the 1950s

OSE was very active in Morocco; its collaboration with SP began as early as the end of the 1940s. In partnership and with partial funding from the JOINT, OSE sent doctors at least three times a year to examine all 300 children. In case of emergency or necessity, the children were transferred to the OSE dispensary in Casablanca. OSE undertook an evaluation on the Nutritional Improvement Diet program, whose pilot project in Morocco was implemented at the SP. Following the program's success, it was extended to other Jewish institutions in Morocco. OSE was responsible for the routine medical examination of children, the annual vaccination program, and the care of chronic children's illnesses and even had a temporary SP infirmary room where sick children were treated on site. In the early 1950s, OSE set up a modern medical dispensary in Casablanca with high-level medical staff. This structure was able to deal with the most common illnesses and emergencies such as the January 1961 outbreak of food poisoning at the SP. OSE undertook a massive campaign against trachoma, from which SP children benefited. In 1954 70% of SP children had trachomatous, in 1955 there were only 50% and in 1956, 30%. In addition, in the 1950s, OSE undertook a massive X-ray treatments campaign to treat ringworm and other diseases, SP children were also part of this program. A few decades later, this treatment was a subject of controversy. In 1959, OSE introduced for the first time in Morocco an antibiotic treatment, griseofulvin, against ringworm, apparently with success and without long-term negative effects.

== THE ACTIONS ==
=== The Suralimentation program (1948) ===
The program was initiated by OSE in 1948 and was tested primarily at the SP, it consisted of giving the children a 'snack' consisting of bread with jam and a nourishing drink, in addition to their lunch. In 1949, the cost of the snack for the OSE was 20 francs per child.

=== The improved nutrition-feeding program (1956) ===
Following Dr. Schmidt's recommendations, the second project was to feed children without meat but with dairy, fish and eggs products; The SP was selected by the OSE and the JOINT as a pilot project to prove the effectiveness of the diet. The program was launched in March 1956 and improvements were noticed within 6 months. School doctors found that children (all below eight years old) were in better health than the control group who had not benefited from the diet. They had gained more weight, grew faster, had better hemoglobin levels, had no vitamin deficiency and looked in a better shape. This plan was later extended to other children's institutions, but this extension required staff training, which required time and additional investments. In 1959, however, a report noted that the diet was deficient in animal protein: ‘The deficiency in animal protein is mainly due to a lack of milk and cheese in the food ration’. In 1960, a report noted that the effect of the JOINT action is visible in the well-being of children

=== Managing a Crisis Situation ===
On January 11, 1961 afternoon, 44 SP children aged between 5 and 6 years old were affected of food poisoning with vomiting, abdominal pain and diarrhea. The children were immediately treated at the OSE dispensary. A thorough investigation was undertaken by JOINT and OSE under the direction of Dr. Tavill, who determined that the intoxication origin came from the state of health of the kitchen staff. Dr. Tavill recommended for the future a thorough medical examination of the staff responsible for food and strict hygiene measures. There is no trace of any recurrence in the JOINT archives.

=== Clothes Distribution ===
Until 1948, the distribution of clothing was possible thanks to the action of the Region of Casablanca, and tailor companies, the distribution being carried out by volunteers. From 1948, the JOINT distributed clothes at least once a year, with a significant budget. For example, in 1958, the 303 children of the SP received clothes for a value of 957,050 francs ($20,200 of 2022). Photos from the 1960s show healthy and well-dressed children.

=== Summer Camps ===
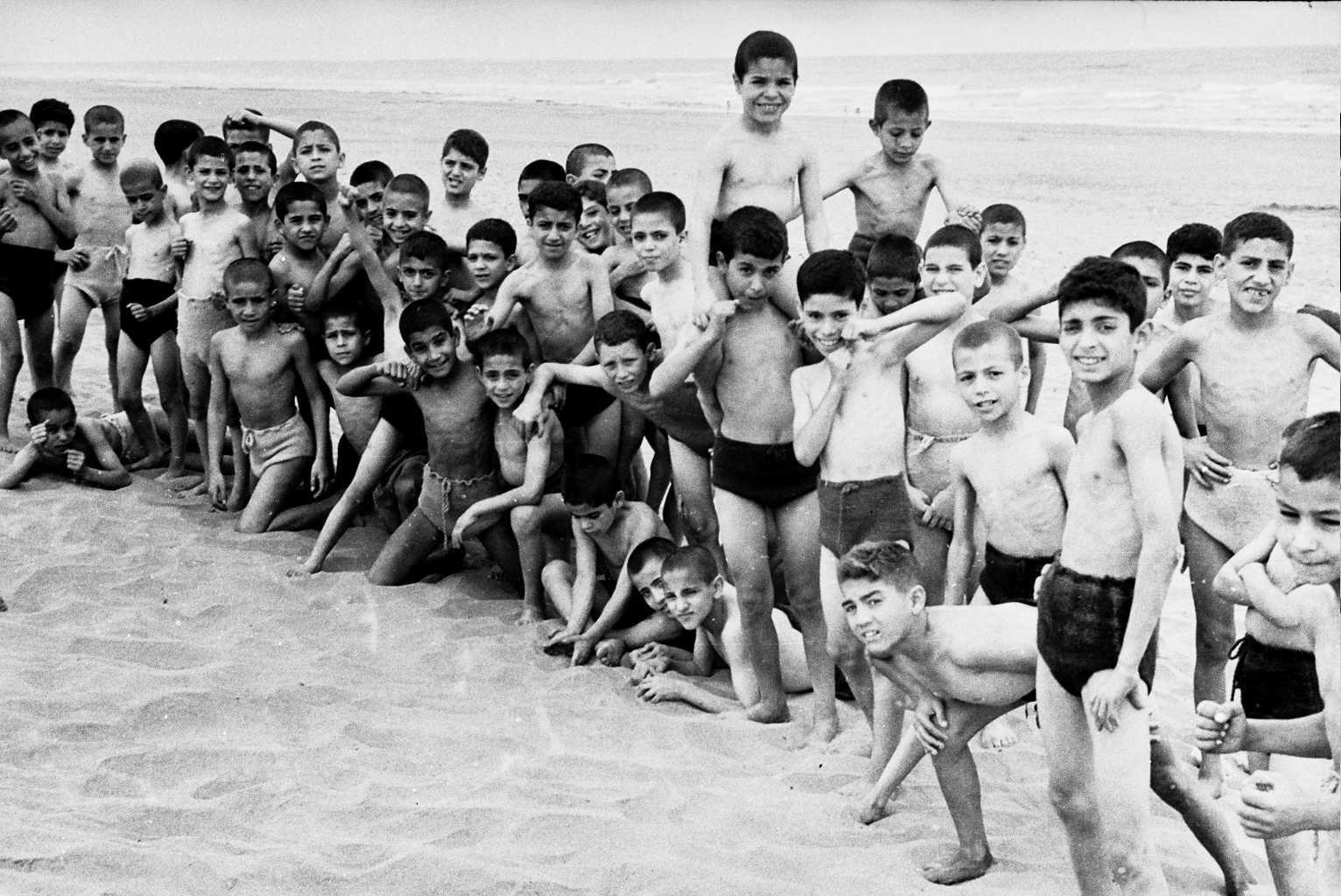
Soup Kitchen "colonie urbaine" 1955

Jewish institutions and French authorities realized the need for open air vacations for those children who had never left the Mellah, who knew neither the sea nor the mountains. The organization ‘L’Aide scolaire’ in Casablanca organized summer camps from the end of the 1940s. The DEJJ (Educational Department of Jewish Youth) trained a series of educators and monitors to supervise the camps. In 1956, 4070 children and in 1958, 5382 children were able to take advantage of summer camps thanks to the authorities and JOINT's funding. SP was not selected and could not send its children to the mountains or to seaside resorts. An alternative solution, ‘La Colonie Urbaine' (Urban Colony), was set up. During the summer, teaching classes were not held; but the children nevertheless went to the SP where three meals were served and outdoor activities were organized. Third of the children, i.e. a hundred, took advantage by rotation of 'La Colonie Urbaine': the AIU made available to the organizers a school, close to the beach, located in the greater suburbs of Casablanca, where the children could sleep and eat. In the morning, the children with a team of monitors left for the beach where they enjoyed outdoor sports and games around noon, they returned to the AIU premises for food and a nap, and in the evening, a car brought the food directly from the SP kitchens.

== The Challenges ==
=== Admission criteria ===
A painful problem faced by SP was the children's selection. In 1961 for example, there were 400 applications for only 300 available places. The JOINT social services established a table of 15 criteria coupled with a point system, the higher the number of points, the more likely the candidate was to be accepted.

=== AIU Schools Limited Access ===
Another acute issue was the children's fate after they left SP. During the 1957–58 school year, six SP classes were not integrated to the AIU due to a lack of facilities. The situation was even more difficult after the independence of Morocco due to the reduction of European classes to which Jewish children had previously wide access, the requirement for trilingualism (French, Hebrew, and Arabic) in the schools of the Alliance and a lower government budget.

== Conclusion ==
In 1961, following the founder's departure to France, Dr. Aboudaram was appointed SP's president. The new committee was composed of George Lévi, Henri Scali, Meyer Moyal, Dr. and Mrs. Bensimon. In October 1964, the institution ceased to exist after 24 years of activity. SP children were transferred to existing Jewish institutions in Casablanca. In 1967, Elias Suraqui was awarded the Legion of Honor mainly because of his charitable activities in Morocco.

== Bibliography ==
- Bensoussan, David (2012). Il était une fois le Maroc : témoignages du passé judéo-marocain. Montréal: Éditions du Lys. ISBN 978-2-922505-21-4.
- Tsur, Yaron (2001). "L'AIU et le judaïsme marocain en 1949 : l'émergence d'une nouvelle démarche politique". Archives Juives. 34 (1): 54–73. doi:10.3917/aj.341.0054.
- Laskier, Michael M. (1983). The Alliance israélite universelle and the Jewish communities of Morocco, 1862-1962. Albany: State University of New York. ISBN 978-0-87395-656-7.
- Cohen, Jean-Louis (1998). Casablanca : mythes et figures d'une aventure urbaine. [Paris]: Hazan. ISBN 978-2-85025-624-0.
- Miller, Susan Gilson (2021). Years of Glory : Nelly Benatar and the Pursuit of Justice in Wartime North Africa. Stanford, California: Stanford University Press. ISBN 978-1-5036-2969-1.
