= Ettedgui Synagogue =

Synagogue in Casablanca, Morocco

- Arabic: كنيس التدغي
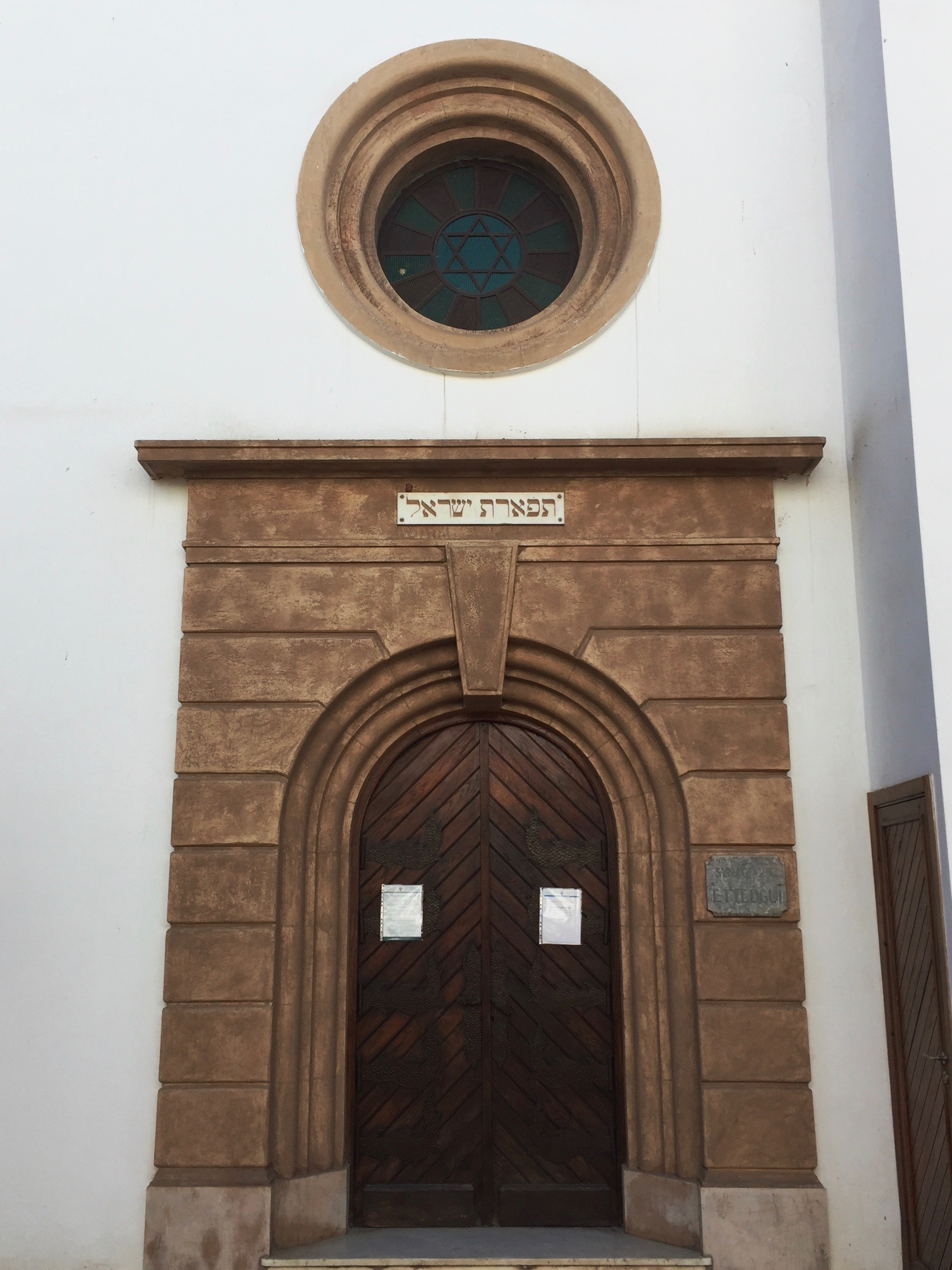
- The synagogue in 2018

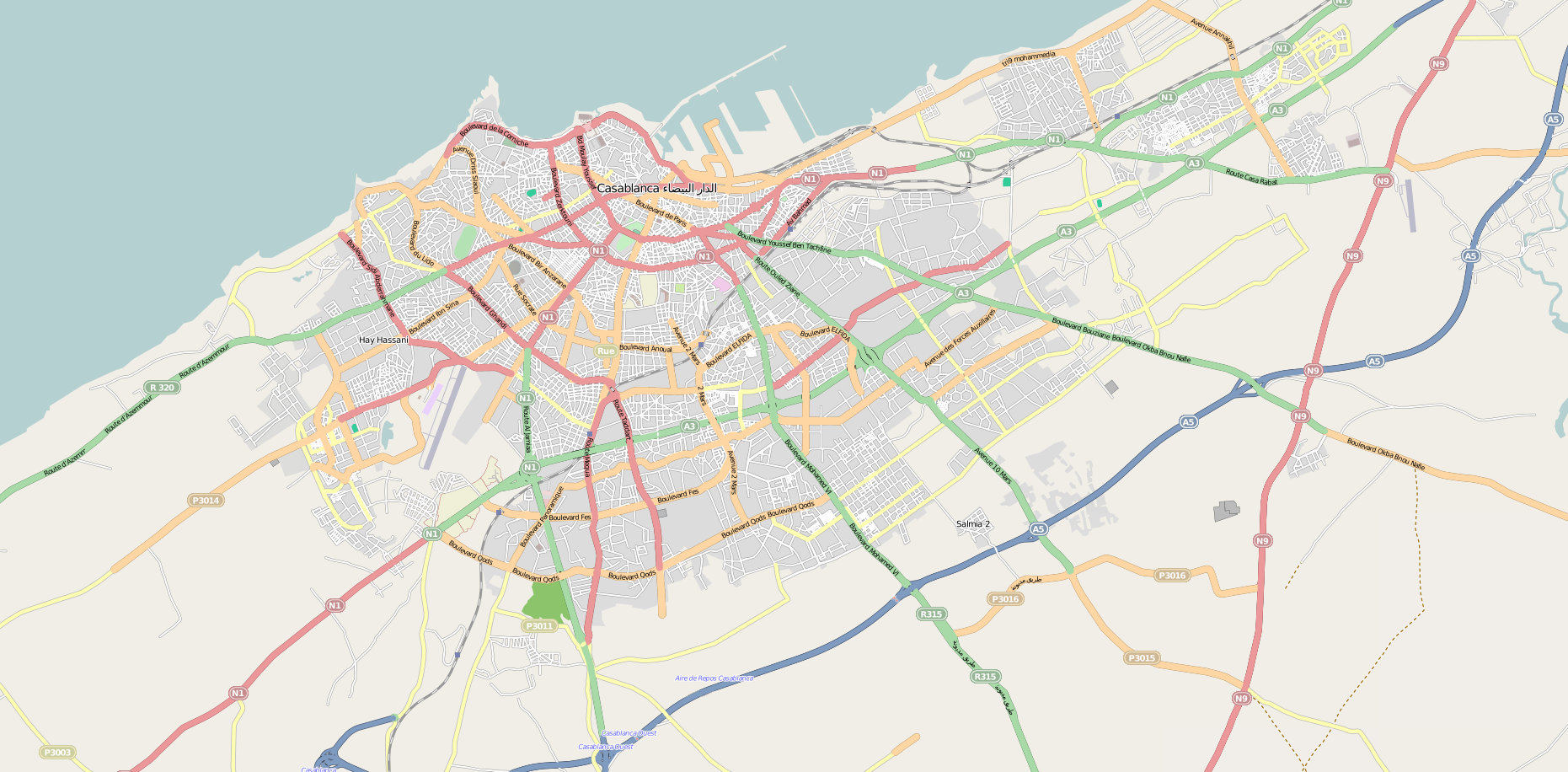
- Location of the synagogue in Greater Casablanca

Religion
- Affiliation: Judaism
- Ecclesiastical or organisational status: Synagogue
- Status: Active

Location
- Location: Casablanca
- Country: Morocco
- Coordinates: 33°36′07″N 7°37′11″W

Architecture
- Architect: Georges Buan
- Type: Synagogue architecture

The Ettedgui Synagogue (Arabic: كنيس التدغي) is a synagogue in the medina of Casablanca, Morocco. It was rededicated by King Mohammed VI of Morocco on December 20, 2016, after it was restored. A government grant of about $844,000 funded the restorations, according to the Maghreb Arab Press.

Next to it, there is a museum dedicated to the Mellah of Casablanca, a quarter traditionally inhabited by the Jewish community in the city.

== History ==
It was one of the most important Jewish sites in the city, next to another synagogue called the Synagogue of the People of Essaouira. The Ettedgui Synagogue was destroyed in the Allied bombardment during the Naval Battle of Casablanca in November 1942. Reconstruction began in 2011, over a half century after its destruction.

== See also ==
- History of the Jews in Morocco
- List of synagogues in Morocco
