= Virgile Barel =

French politician (1889–1979)

- Born: 17 December 1889; Drap, Alpes-Maritimes, France
- Died: 7 November 1979 (aged 89); Nice, France
- Occupation: Politician
- Political party: French Communist Party

Virgile Barel (1889–1979) was a French Communist politician. He served as a member of the National Assembly from 1936 to 1940, from 1945 to 1951, from 1956 to 1958, and from 1967 to 1973. The Boulevard Virgile Barel in the Saint Roch neighbourhood of Nice was named in his honour.

== Biography ==
Virgile Barel was born in Drap, a village in the Paillon Valley, to a father who was a saddler and a mother who was a seamstress.

He entered the École normale in Nice in 1906 and graduated at the top of his class in 1909. He was appointed to Breil, then to Castellar, Alpes-Maritimes and Menton.

Having read Henri Barbusse Le Feu and deeply affected by his experience of war, he joined the SFIO in 1918, which was only accepted in 1919, after the war, due to “the request of the leaders of the Nice section of the Party not to put at too much risk an officer in the army.” A non-commissioned officer, then an officer during the First World War I, he was wounded three times in combat. He was awarded the Croix de Guerre and the Croix de la Légion d'Honneur.

In favor of breaking with the socialism of the “Sacred Union” and “class collaboration,” he joined the Communist International. As a schoolteacher, he was active in the ranks of the General Confederation of Unitary Labor (CGTU) and wrote for the union newsletter Notre Arme. In 1922, he founded a branch of the Republican Association of Veterans (ARAC) in Menton.

After his first trip to the Soviet Union in 1928, which reinforced his convictions, he became a permanent member of the party. In 1934, he obtained early retirement from his teaching position on medical grounds. A trusted confidant of Maurice Thorez and his team for the Southeast Region, he became a senior member of the organization, responsible for implementing the new anti-fascist line in the mid-1930s. He was one of the founders of the communist weekly Le Cri des travailleurs des A.-M., which published its first issue in January 1935.
