= École normale supérieure (disambiguation) =

An École normale supérieure (French pronunciation: [ekɔl nɔʁmal sypeʁjœʁ]) or ENS is a type of publicly funded higher education institution in France.

École normale supérieure may refer to:

- École normale supérieure de Lyon
- École normale supérieure (Paris)
- École normale supérieure Paris-Saclay
- École normale supérieure de Rennes
- former École normale supérieure de lettres et sciences humaines
- former École normale supérieure de Fontenay-aux-Roses
