= Mellah of Casablanca =

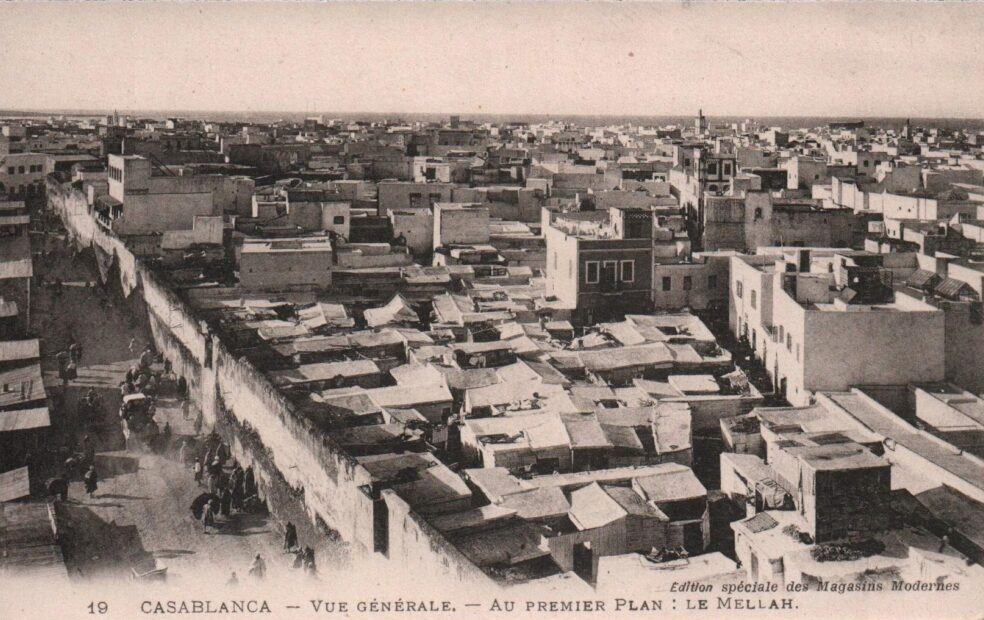
A general view of Casablanca with the Mellah in the foreground, taken around the turn of the 20th century.

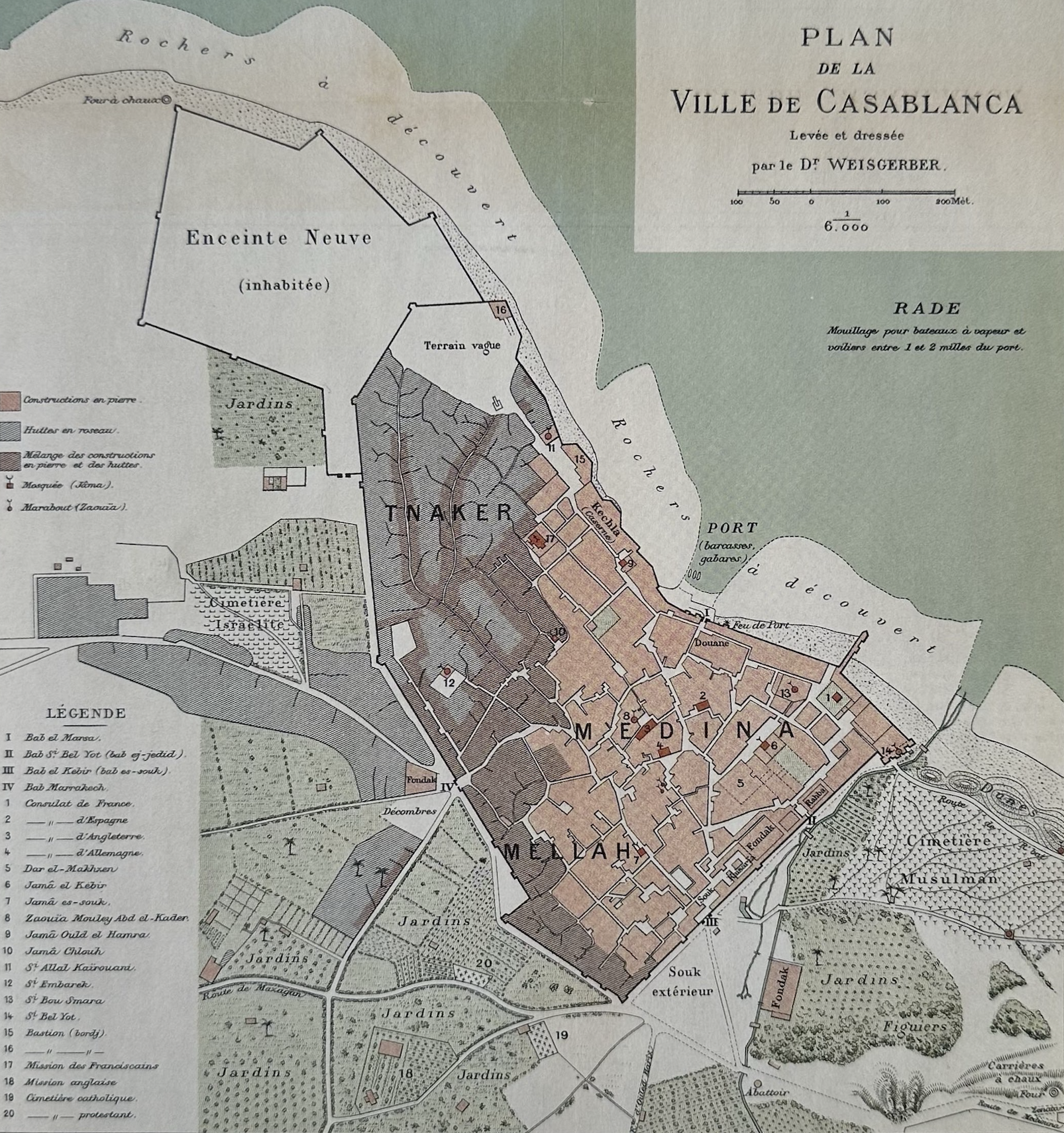
The Mellah in relation to the Medina, Tnaker, and the old port in a map of Casablanca by the French doctor Frédéric Weisgerber, published in 1900.

The Mellah of Casablanca was a part of the pre-colonial city that was traditionally inhabited by the Jews of Casablanca. The Mellah was located in the southern part of the Medina, between Bab es-Souq and Bab Marrakesh. Unlike older mellah quarters in other cities, the Mellah of Casablanca was not separated from the rest of the Medina by a wall or a gate, and there was an area at the periphery between the two quarters inhabited by both Jews and Muslims. The street called Rue des Synagogues also had mosques and zawiyas.

== History ==
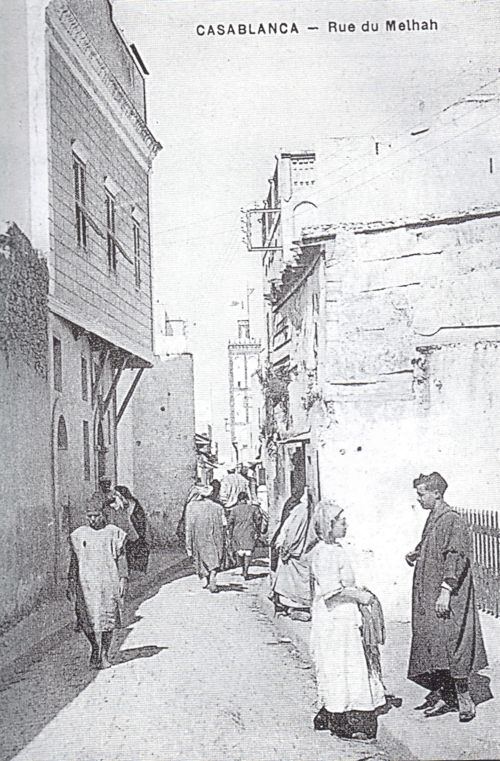
A street in the Mellah of Casablanca at the beginning of the twentieth century

According to tradition, the first of the modern Jewish community in Casablanca came from Ben Ahmed near Settat to the south in the Chaouia plain, then under the control of the Mzab tribe. After the reopening of the port of Casablanca for trade in 1831, with commercial development through European economic penetration, industrial imports from Europe drove traditional Jewish crafts out of the market, costing many Jews in the interior their traditional livelihoods. Moroccan Jews started migrating from the interior to coastal cities such as Essaouira, Mazagan, Asfi, and later Casablanca for economic opportunity, participating in trade with Europeans and the development of those cities. Casablanca also attracted Jewish merchants from other major cities.

At the time of European colonization, the Mellah had not been completely constructed—huts and cabanas existed alongside more firmly constructed homes. This was especially the case in the area known as bḥīra (بحيرة lit. 'little sea', refers to a garden with a reservoir), the most squalid portion of the Mellah.

In the 1907 bombardment of Casablanca, the beginning of the French invasion of Morocco from the West, mellah was pillaged after the landing and invasion of French troops and subsequent invasion of tribesmen from the Chaouia. According to testimony from the director of the school of the Alliance Israélite Universelle:

From the first cannon round, the soldiers of the Makhzen advanced towards the mellah, followed by the general populace, and the looting began. The 5,000–6,000 tribesmen who had been waiting outside the gates entered the city and swept throughout the mellah as well as the medina, stealing, pillaging, raping, killing, and burning... (Note: Original French text: les soldats du Makhzen, dès le premier coup de canon, se précipitent sur le mellah, suivis de la populace, et commencent le pillage. Les 5 à 6 000 hommes des tribus, qui attendaient aux portes, pénètrent en ville, se répandent tant au mellah qu'à la médina, volent, pillent, violent, tuent, incendient...)

As Jews from around Morocco moved to Casablanca during the French protectorate (1912–1956), they congregated in the mellah. Poor Jews lived in the mellah throughout the protectorate, though Jews were not required to live there and some moved into nearby neighborhoods as they could afford to do so.

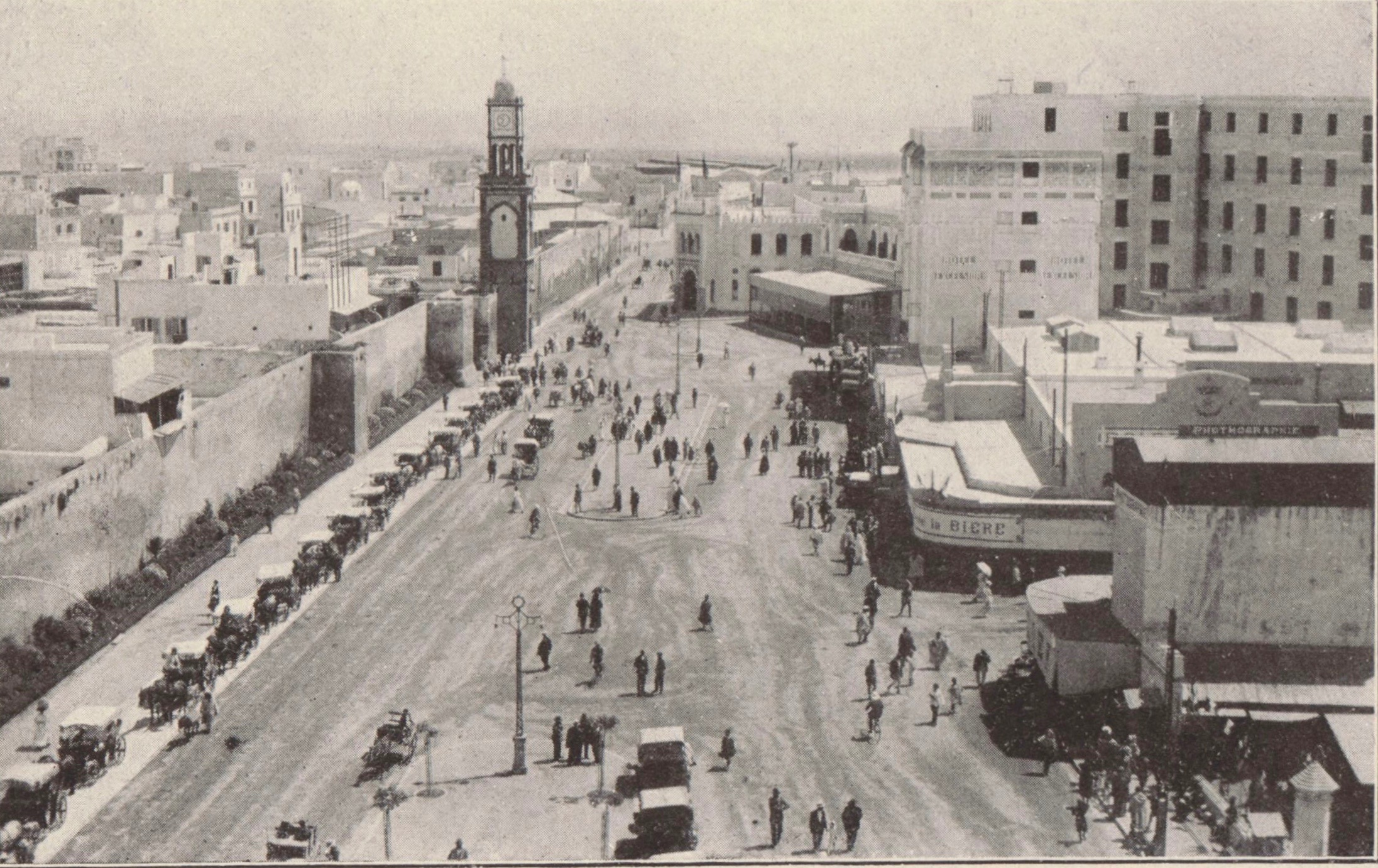
Place de France (now United Nations Square) and walls of the Mellah to the left in 1917. The space became a contact point between what the colonists called the ville indigène to the left—comprising the Mellah and the Medina—and the European nouvelle ville to the right.

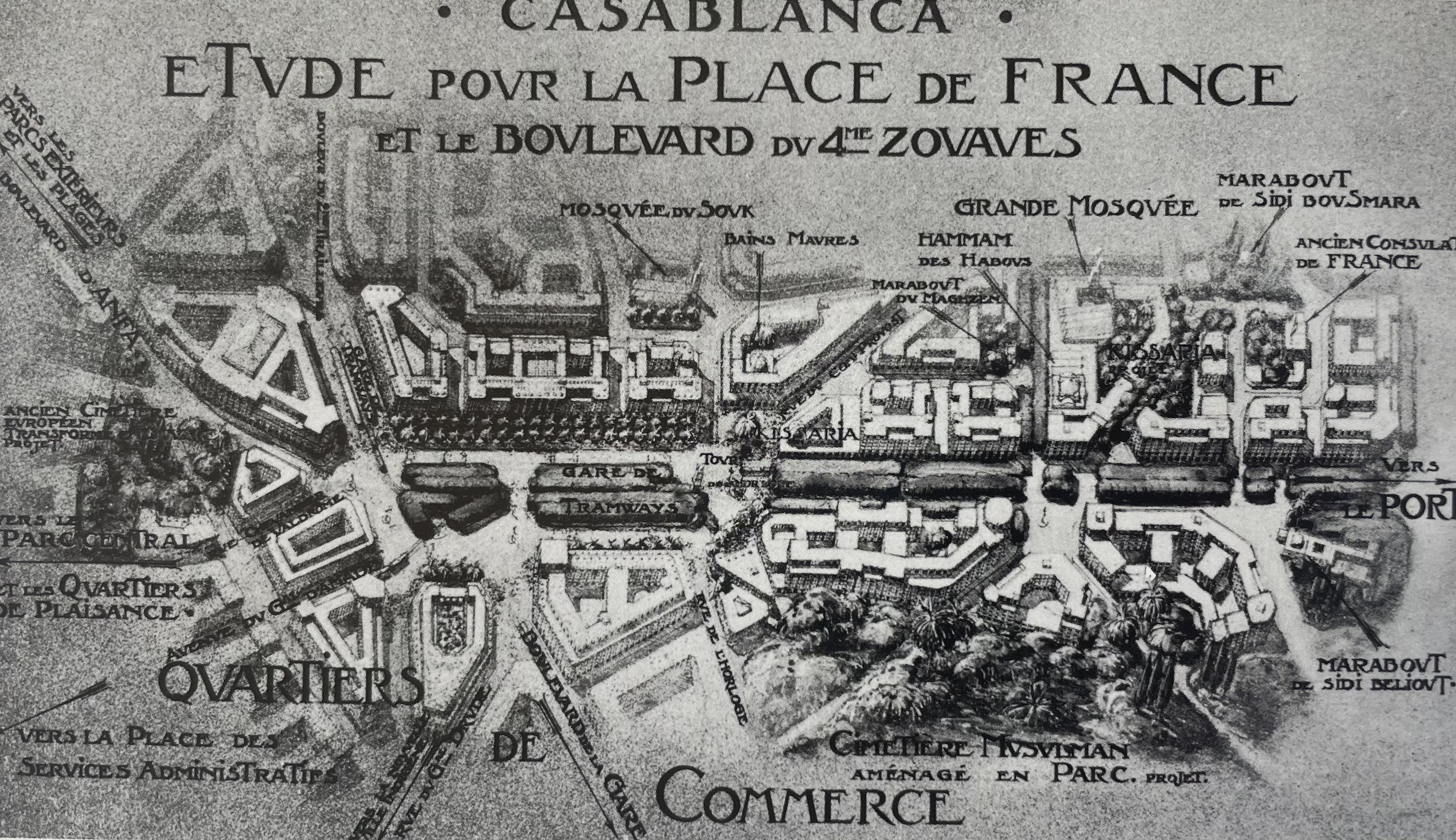
Henri Prost's 1923 study for a development plan in which the Place de France would expand into and replace the Mellah.

As Casablanca developed and expanded, the mellah was repeatedly threatened by colonial architects' plans to expand the Place de France (now United Nations Square). According to Jean-Louis Cohen, "the square's history can be said to emphasize the ambiguous and ever-changing attitude of the Protectorate with respect to the Jewish community."

A group of concerned residents of the mellah told Hubert Lyautey in a collective letter:

This project consists of gutting the neighborhood, which has been home to our kin for almost a century, in the aim of widening the main street of the new town, the so-called Place de France... Never in the entire history of French North Africa has a project of this type been conceived, let alone put into effect... In Casablanca, though, the order has been issued to pull down our houses, synagogues, and mausoleums, which for decades past have formed the resting place for the remains of our venerated saints... The administration's handsome designs for our poor little mellah may well be far worthier than our tumbledown houses, shop booths and modest temples, but in our eyes, these booths and temples represent an entire century of toil and labor.

By 1968, the old Mellah of the turn of the 20th century had practically disappeared, with its former territory almost entirely consumed by the square and an adjacent parking lot.

== See also ==
- Mellah of Fes
- Mellah of Marrakesh
