= LD Malca =

French-Moroccan music producer

Kid of Casablanca Malca
- Born: Lionel David Malca; Paris, France
- Origin: Casablanca, Morocco
- Genre: Electro fusion [
- Label: Jelly Robots Records

Malca, is a French-Moroccan musician specializing in electro fusion. He draws influence from African American music, Algerian rai, and Moroccan chaabi, and has been described as "Le roi de la Pop au Maroc."

== Biography ==
Malca was born in Paris, France. He grew up in Casablanca, Morocco. In an interview with Huffington Post Maroc, Malca explained his interest in Casablanca, describing it as "a schizophrenic, young, miscegenated city, where different elements—such as vestiges of the French Colonial Empire, ghosts of an American dream dominated by ultra-capitalism, and massive, somewhat vulgar structures borrowing from the Middle East—are married." He also described himself as "a young man obsessed with East-West dialogue."

== Discography ==
=== Casablanca Jungle EP ===
The Casablanca Jungle EP was released by Jelly Robots Records on November 17, 2017. The music video for the title track "Casablanca Jungle" was shot in Casablanca.

1. "Casablanca Jungle (Extended Version)"
2. "Shalom"
3. "Ya Layli"
4. "Wham"
5. "I'm Not a Legend"
