= Morocco in World War II =

Map of French and Spanish protectorates in Morocco at the time of World War II French Morocco (1912–56) Spanish Morocco (1912–56) Tangier International Zone (1924–56; occupied 1940–45) French Algeria and French West Africa Spain, Spanish Sahara and Spanish Ifni

During World War II, Morocco was controlled by Nazi Germany. However, after the North African campaign (June 1940 – May 1943), Morocco was liberated by the Allies and was thus active in Allied operations until the end of the war.

== Background ==
=== Northern Morocco ===
During this period, Northern Morocco was controlled by Spain through a nominally independent puppet regime headed by a viceroy. While it participated in the Spanish Civil War, like Spain itself, Northern Morocco was officially neutral during World War II.

=== Southern Morocco ===
In 1940, France surrendered to Nazi Germany and was divided into two regions, with northern and western France occupied, by German forces headquartered in Paris. In southern and central France, a nominally independent "free zone" was known as Vichy France, after its capital city (Vichy). Around the world, the various French colonial administrations and overseas departments gave their allegiance to either Vichy or the rival Free French and government in exile (located in London) that had remained part of the Allied powers.

A political map of France in 1940–42. (German forces occupied Vichy France from November 1942.)

In southern Morocco, the colonial administration was initially loyal to the Vichy regime. In 1940–42, Moroccan Jews faced significant restrictions, due to the introduction of Vichy anti-Jewish legislation.

Following Allied landings in November 1942, the colonial administration in southern Morocco remained in place, although it switched its affiliation from Vichy to Free France. In January 1943, Allied control also made southern Morocco an ideal location for the Casablanca Conference, where Winston Churchill and Franklin D. Roosevelt met to discuss wartime operations. On the home front in southern Morocco, daily life changed little, although the nationalist movement attempted to gain momentum, despite facing opposition from French forces. During this period, many indigenous Moroccan soldiers were recruited by Free French forces to fight with the Allies.

== Life during World War II ==
Slavery existed in Morocco before and during the establishment of the French protectorate, with many wealthy Moroccans owning slaves, including the Moroccan royal family. Shanty towns arose near Moroccan cities in the 1930s which continued to grow during the war. European refugees fleeing to Morocco experienced poverty on their arrival, and many of those in Casablanca slept in converted dance halls with poor conditions. Separate educational institutions were set up for the Muslim and the French population. Access to the baccalaureate was provided to the Moroccan Muslim population in 1930, but access to elite French schools (lycees) was not provided to the Muslim population until after the end of the war. Around ninety percent of the Muslim population of Morocco was illiterate during World War II.

=== Discrimination against Jews ===
Before World War II, a large portion of Jews in Morocco, much like the majority of the Muslim population, lived in poverty. The bulk of the Jewish population lived in crowded Jewish quarters named mellahs. Resident General Charles Noguès did not allow Jews who enlisted in 1939 and 1940 to fight, but only to work on the industrial side of the war effort. In 1940, laws were put in place by the Vichy administration which disallowed the majority of Jews from working as doctors, lawyers or teachers. All Jews living in other neighbourhoods of Morocco were required to leave their houses and re-inhabit the mellahs. Vichy antisemitic propaganda was distributed throughout Morocco to encourage the boycotting of Jews. Pamphlets were pinned on the frontages of Jewish shops. Around 7,700 Jews who attempted to flee Morocco in favour of America or Palestine were moved to detention centres. Some refugees considered a threat to the Vichy regime were sent to labour camps. The American landings in 1942 created hope that the Vichy laws would discontinue, but General Noguès persuaded the Allies to allow the continuation of French rule and Vichy laws.

=== Moroccan nationalist movements ===
Moroccan anti-occupation nationalist movements gained momentum in Morocco during World War II against the French and Spanish occupation of Morocco. Nationalists in Spanish Morocco created the 'National Reform Party' and the 'Moroccan Unity Movement', which united during the war and were common vehicles for Fascist propaganda. The 1942 landings were encouraged by the nationalists in French Morocco, who hoped the Allies would assist in the fight for Moroccan independence. After Moroccan nationalists in French Morocco then found to have received letters from Ibrahim al-Wazzani, a nationalist in Spanish Morocco who was involved in aiding the Axis powers, the Allies rejected independence and upheld the Vichy laws. On 11 January 1944, a group of Moroccan nationalists, in French Morocco, created a declaration of Moroccan Independence which they proceeded to display to the French Resident General. By 18 January 1944, the Moroccan sultan and other influential figures had demonstrated their approval for the nationalists. French authorities arrested influential nationalists linked to this document and took many to prison camps. However, for many Moroccans, this only worked to increase support for the movement. The British secretly funded many Moroccan nationalist activities in Southern and Northern Morocco, in an attempt to prevent German control of the country.

=== Moroccan goumiers ===
Goumiers were indigenous Moroccan soldiers in World War II. Fifty-three percent of the soldiers provided to France by its colonial empire in September 1939 came from Morocco and areas of North Africa. After the Allied landing in Casablanca in 1942 (Operation Torch), the French administration in Morocco began to support the Allied powers. The goumiers began to be used by the Allies, mostly in mountain areas due to their effective mountaineering abilities.

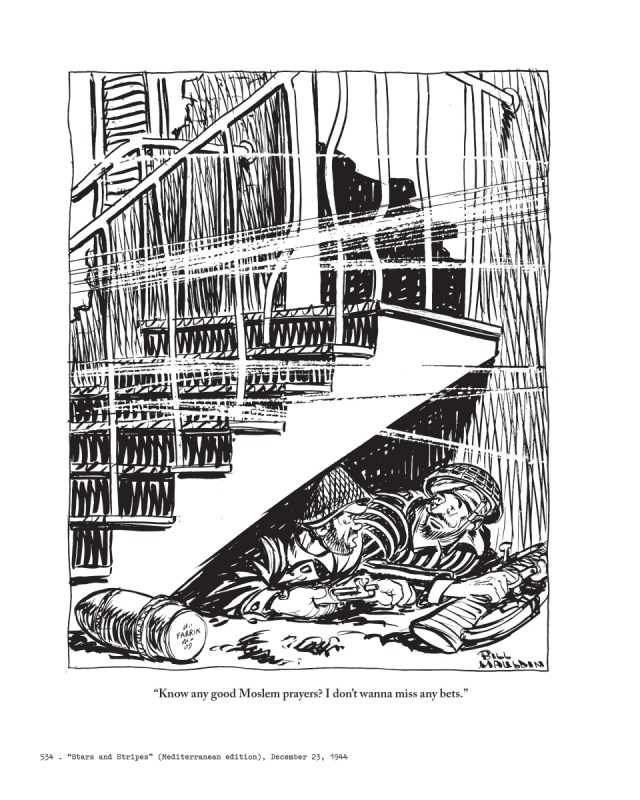
A Willie and Joe comic by Bill Mauldin (published by Stars and Stripes in December 1944), Joe and a Moroccan Goumier take cover from German gun-fire. Joe asks: "Know any good Moslem prayers? I don't wanna miss any bets."

Goumiers fought against German forces in Tunisia, successfully removing the Germans in the area and taking over ten thousand prisoners of war. The goumiers also participated in the Sicilian campaign (Operation Husky) and the liberation of Corsica. The German withdrawal from Corsica allowed Allied control of its airfields, for use in subsequent campaigns against France and Italy. The goumiers also successfully conquered the island of Elba, which was being used as a base for German aircraft and E-boats. They also partook in Operation Diadem, where they aided in successfully infiltrating the Axis Gustav line which stretched across the Italian mountains. Moreover, their fighting across the Aurunci mountains helped the Allied troops break the Hitler Line. The taking of Route 6 by the goumiers allowed the Allies to enter and liberate Rome. In July, the goumiers went on to liberate Sienna from German control. Ten thousand goumiers successfully liberated Marseilles from German control, driving the German troops to Vieux-Port, with General Schaeffer ordering his German troops to surrender the city in August 1944.

After pushing the German troops back at Monte Cassino in Italy, the Moroccan forces of the French army were granted fifty hours of total freedom from punishment for crime. During this time, many rapes and murders were committed against the Italian people in what was called the Marocchinate. The monument Mamma Ciociara, in Sacco of the Campania region, was designed to pay tribute to the women who were abused and lost their lives during this event.

=== Propaganda ===
The Germans, the British, and the French all employed propaganda in Morocco in World War II. From 1939, using Radio Berlin and Radio Stuttgart, Nazi Germany broadcast propaganda throughout Morocco. This propaganda significantly promoted the idea of German friendship to the locals whilst being largely anti-semitic. From 1943, the Moroccan Bureau du Maghreb Arab, created the journal 'al-maghrib al arabi' to disseminate Nazi propaganda. The BBC began broadcasting news of the war to Morocco in 1939, presenting a pro-Britain outlook. Broadcasts from Radio London attempted to present Britain as benevolent to gain the support of Morocco's population. In 1942, Moroccan dialects were introduced to the British broadcasts, in an attempt to successfully reach more people. Propaganda was also used by the French in Morocco towards the indigenous Moroccan soldiers. Newspapers such as the Annasr attempted to establish a feeling of nationalism in the goumiers. Many images were used in this propaganda to allow it to be accessible to illiterate soldiers.

== Military events ==
=== Operation Torch ===
Around 90,000 Allied forces, sailing from ports in Virginia and in Britain, amphibiously landed at Algeria and Morocco on 8 November 1942. The invasion was meant to force the Vichy territories of North Africa into Allied control while allowing movement through the African coast.

The Moroccan sultan, Sidi Mohammed Ben Youssef, welcomed Allied forces. Around 60,000 French troops resisted the Allied invasion while many deserted to join the Allied forces. Despite Vichy resistance, the Allied forces took control of Fedala, Safi, and Casablanca by 11 November 1942 and a ceasefire was negotiated on the same day. Following this, Vichy French forces fought for the Allied powers, per an agreement enforced on November 13, 1942. This switch in alliance caused Hitler to occupy the entirety of France and to send Axis forces to fight the Allies in the Mediterranean theatre.

Medical units were significantly lacking when the Western Task Force of the Allied troops landed in Morocco on 8 November 1942. Only twenty ambulances were fit for use and surgical operations taking place that night had only three torches for lighting. A single fridge (which was purchased from a Moroccan merchant) was available for refrigeration of supplies. As there was a lack of transportation, it took an extended period for supplies coming off the ships to reach medical units. Allied forces in their campaigns in Italy supplied the goumiers and French army with medical officers who carried medical bags containing basic medical supplies, so care could still be applied in the event of delay of supplies. The Allies also provided what was known as "evacuation hospitals", which contained Allied medical staff who landed in Morocco with forces during Operation Torch. These hospitals followed the French colonial army on campaigns in Morocco and in the Italian region. The hospitals would set up 18 miles behind the front line and provide medical care for wounded soldiers.

=== Casablanca Conference ===
In January 1943, Winston Churchill and Franklin D. Roosevelt, accompanied by their advisors, met secretly in a hotel in Casablanca to discuss current issues and to decide Allied war strategies. A policy of unconditional surrender was adopted at this conference. According to Roosevelt, this was to ensure

the destruction of the philosophies in those countries which are based on conquest and the subjugation of other people.

Roosevelt also met with Sultan Mohammed V of Morocco at the Casablanca Conference and urged him to work towards independence for Morocco from Spanish and French forces.

== Sultan Mohammad V ==
Sidi Mohammed Ben Youssef of Morocco, or Mohammad V, was the Sultan of Morocco during the World War II period. He was chosen by the French Residency to be Sultan because it was believed that he would be the easiest of his siblings for French officials to successfully control.

As Morocco was under Vichy control, Mohammad V had little power to prevent Vichy discrimination laws, but he expressed his moral objection to them in his dealings with French officials. Mohammad V did protect the Jewish population in some ways, preventing the use of the Star of David from being used to identify Jewish subjects in Morocco. He also insisted Vichy laws apply only to those who identified religiously as Jewish, rather than based on birth, as was standard Nazi policy. Mohammad V also invited Jewish subjects to a banquet he hosted in 1941 without French approval.

Following the landings of the Allies in Morocco, President Roosevelt wrote to Mohammad V saying that the Allies would be benevolent subjugators in Morocco. In his letter, he wrote:

The arrival of the American forces in your country in collaboration with forces of the protecting power is merely a token of American intention to assist in defending your sovereignty and in protecting your country and mine against a common enemy whose power will be destroyed.

Mohammad V replied:

The first contacts between people who do not know each other well enough are always marked by hesitation and reticence, but progressively a reciprocal understanding is established between them, they are followed by esteem and friendship which creates a cooperative effort profitable to all.

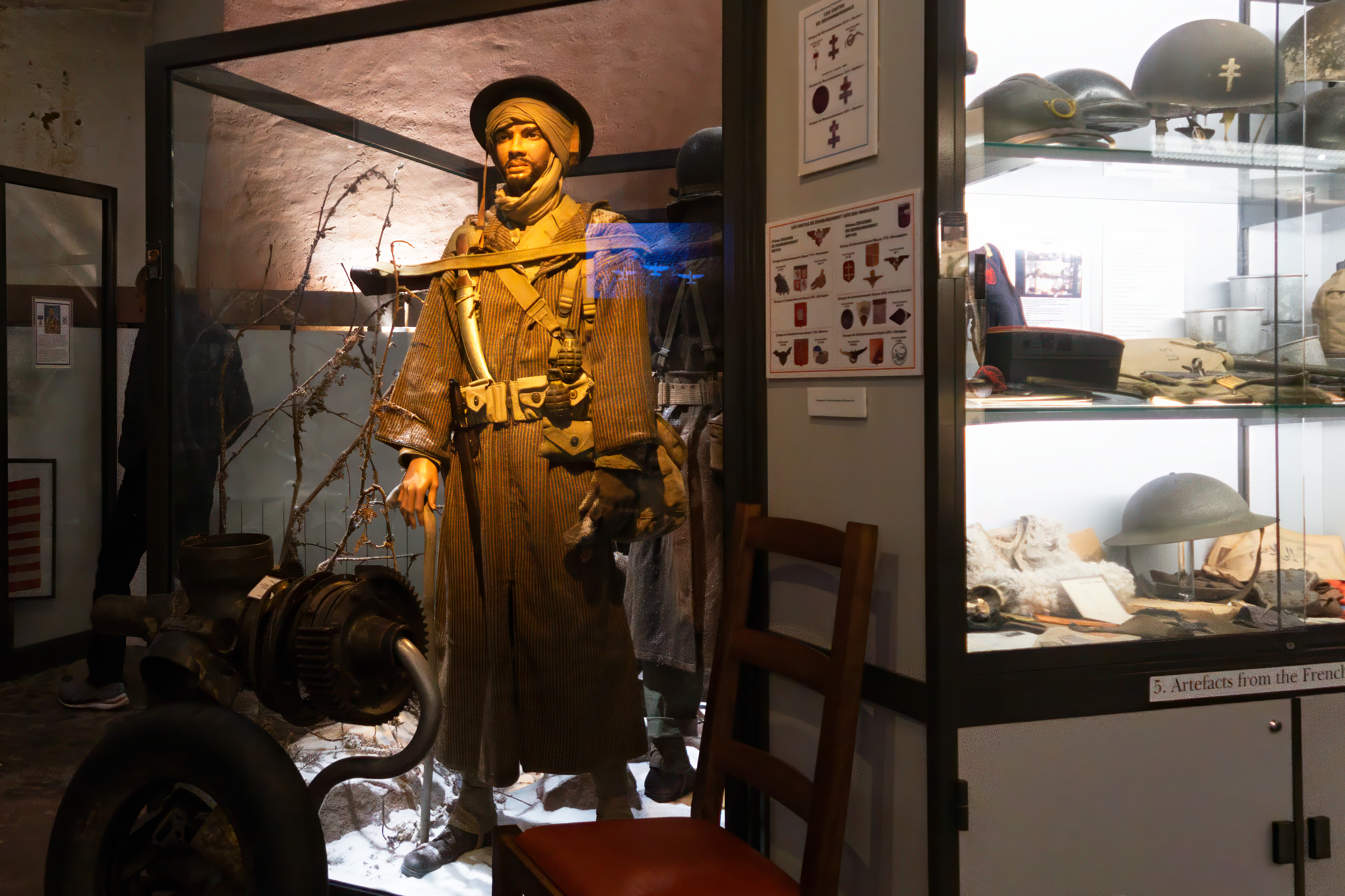
A modern day museum depiction of a WWII-era Moroccan soldier displayed in the Memorial Museum of the Battles of the “Colmar Pocket” (Musée Mémorial des Combats de la “Poche de Colmar”)

== Aftermath ==
For several years after World War II, the United States and other former Allies continued to be involved in Morocco, whose resources were used during the Cold War. In 1951, the US had five air bases in use in Morocco. In 1953, Mohammad V was exiled to Corsica for refusing to approve the enforcement of several French laws, then Madagascar. Two years later, he was allowed to return due to violence that occurred during his absence.

On 2 March 1956, a Franco-Moroccan agreement overrode the Treaty of Fez that had established the French protectorate. Morocco became independent on 7 April 1956 when France relinquished control of the area.
