= École Normale Hébraïque =

Coordinates: 33.5581°N 7.6431°W

École Normale Hébraïque المدرسة العبرية العادية
- Casablanca; Morocco

Information
- Established: 1945

The École Normale Hébraïque ("Jewish Normal School", Arabic: المدرسة العبرية العادية) is a Jewish secondary school in Casablanca, Morocco, opened in 1945. In 2005, it had 138 students, 26 of whom are French. The school is a partner institution of the Agency for French Education Abroad (AEFE). The École Normale functions as both a junior high school and a senior high school/as a secondary school and as a sixth-form college.

== See also ==
- Jewish community in Casablanca
