= Zionism in Morocco =

Organized Zionism, the 19th century ethnocultural nationalist movement to establish a Jewish state through the colonization of Palestine, came to Morocco from Europe at the beginning of the 20th century. During the period of French and Spanish colonial rule, it spread slowly in Moroccan Jewish communities, especially in Tangier and the Spanish zone in the north, through Zionist associations and advocacy, as well as through Zionist literature and propaganda. The small but effective Zionist movement in Morocco was organized and led locally by a faction of secular, urban Jews educated in elite European educational systems, especially the schools of the Alliance Israélite Universelle (AIU), and it had considerable support and sometimes direct intervention from Zionist organizations abroad.

The influence of Zionism in urban centers and along the coasts was very different from its influence in rural areas in the hinterland, such as villages in the Atlas Mountains, Sous valley, Draa valley, and pre-Sahara, and it appealed to different groups for different reasons. Urban, elite Moroccan Jews were divided on the question of Zionism: there were those who supported modern secular Zionism; there were those who were invested in the project of Westernization and who saw Zionism as an obstacle to achieving integration with the Europeans; and there were those who saw Zionism as an obstacle to a favored Jewish-Muslim alliance and coexistence in Morocco. The latter school of thought is perhaps most pronounced in the post-independence organization al-Wifaq. Scholars have seen Zionism and the Moroccan Nationalist Movement in the years leading up to Moroccan independence in 1956 as two nationalist movements in competition for the membership of Moroccan Jews, particularly those living outside of urban areas, characterizing both as seeing this population as 'theirs.' For many rural Moroccan Jews, in addition to economic reasons, the religious importance of the Land of Israel in their beliefs had a major role in their decision to emigrate.

Only after the establishment of the State of Israel in Palestine in 1948 was there significant Zionist emigration from Morocco. Emigration, organized and facilitated by Zionist groups from outside of Morocco, increased significantly in the period before Moroccan independence in 1956. From 1949 to 1956, Cadima, a migration apparatus administered by Jewish Agency and Mossad Le'Aliyah agents sent from Israel, organized the migration of over 60,000 Moroccan Jews to Israel. From 1961 to 1964, almost 90,000 Moroccan Jews were migrated to Israel in Operation Yachin, an Israeli-led initiative in which the Hebrew Immigrant Aid Society paid King Hassan II a sum per capita for each Moroccan Jew who migrated to Israel. Although Moroccan Jews seeking to migrate to Israel faced restrictions from both the Moroccan and Israeli governments at different times, roughly two thirds of the Jews of Morocco eventually migrated to Israel.

The Kingdom of Morocco formally normalized relations with the State of Israel in 2020 when it joined the Abraham Accords brokered by the United States during the first presidency of Donald Trump.

== History ==
=== 1900s and 1910s ===
Organized Zionism appeared in Morocco in the period just before colonization, around 1900–1912 due to the influence of European Zionist activists, with interest in Zionism in this early period mostly limited to secular coastal elites, affluent merchants, and a number of influential rabbis, especially in Fes. The Israeli historian Michael Laskier cites some early sources of Zionism in Moroccan coastal cities, which had more direct contact with Europe as well as populations of Jews who received a European education, especially through the Alliance Israélite Universelle: in Tetuan, where the Russian physician Dr. Ya'akov Barliawsky settled and established the Shivat-Zion (שיבת ציון 'Return to Zion') Association (Note: Also Shivat Ṣiyyon Society. The AIU facilitated the arrival of Dr. Jacques Berliowsky (Yaʿaqov Barliawsky) in 1891. Judah Leon Jalfon, a rabbi in Tetuan, wrote to Theodor Herzl of the establishment of the Shivat-Zion society as early as 1900. The society did not last long, but it started a Hebrew library.) around 1900; in Mogador (now Essaouira), where an association called Sha'are Zion (Note: Also Shaʿare Ṣiyyon Society. Zionism in Mogador was propelled early on by Moses Logasy, a merchant active in Manchester, England that returned to Mogador to sell shares in the Jewish Colonial Trust. His endeavor led to the establishment of Shaʿare Ṣiyyon, led by the merchants David Bohbot and Samuel Bendahan, and Mogador rabbi Jacob Ifargan.) might have been the first to popularize the Zionist shekel in North Africa (Sha'are Zion sent 200 shekelim to the Zionist Federation in Cologne, allowing them to send two delegates to the Zionist Congress, though they did not); and in Asfi, where an association called Ahavat-Zion was founded. In 1908, the Hibbat-Zion Society was founded in Fes, the inland capital, by 20 leading rabbis and notables. (Note: The following year, it expanded to Meknes and Sefrou. Because the Zionist Organization would not be able to cover and protect the association, it sought the support of the Alliance Israélite Universelle.) It was in contact with the Zionist Federation in Cologne, popularized the Zionist shekel, and expanded its activity to nearby Sefrou and Meknes. According to the historian Zvi Yehuda, these early associations followed instructions from the Zionist Organization (called the World Zionist Organization after 1960), which did not initiate or structure Zionist activity in Morocco as it did in other Muslim countries.

Zionist activity in Morocco came to a halt after the formal establishment of French and Spanish colonial rule in Morocco in 1912, with the activity of local Zionist associations mostly limited to the dissemination of Zionist literature and the popularization of the shekel. The French government saw Zionism as an ally of its British imperial rivals. Zvi Yahuda credits the Fédération sioniste de France (FSF), the London Office of the Zionist Organization, and Abraham Yahuda, then lecturing at the University of Madrid, with renewing Zionist activity in Morocco after World War I.

The Balfour Declaration and San Remo conference were celebrated among Moroccan Zionists and inspired them to strengthen their connections with European Zionism. After the Balfour Declaration, a man named Joseph Levy of the Maccabean Land Company of London went to Fes to distribute Zionist literature and sell land in Palestine to some Fessi Jews. In 1919, the Tetuani Rabbi Judah Leon Jalfón, a pillar of Zionism in the Spanish zone, published an article in support of Zionism in El Eco de Tetuán, a Spanish newspaper, in which he fuses political and religious Zionism, describes Zion (Palestine) as the birthplace of the Jewish nation, and describes Zionism as "the idea of a people living in their free homeland." In March of the same year, Rabbi Pinhas Khalifa Ha-Cohen Azogh led a Zionist office in Marrakesh, from which leaflets from the Fédération sioniste de France were translated into Arabic and distributed, and from which Zionist fundraising efforts were organized. Rabbi Pinhas Cohen collected money from the Jews in Marrakesh and in April, May, and June expanded his fundraising to Jewish communities in the Sous region south of Mogador. He sent the money collected, about 2000 francs, from the Jews of Marrakesh to the Jewish National Fund bureau in Paris, at which time he also made contact with the Zionist Organization. Through the Maccabean Land Company, Cohen also sold 36 plots of land in Palestine to Jews in Morocco, who were told years later when they attempted to move and settle there that the land had been reserved for Eastern European Jews to settle.

The French Résident Général Hubert Lyautey, safeguarding his politique musulmane, began monitoring Zionist activities and propaganda in Morocco, with the approval of his advisor Yaḥyā Zagury, inspector general of Jewish institutions under the French protectorate.

=== 1920s ===
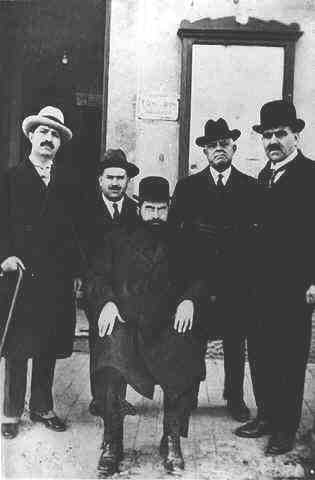
Rabbi Judah Leon Jalfón—founder of the Shivat-Zion (שיבת ציון 'Return to Zion') Association in Tetuan, seated—with Ariel Bension—emissary of the Jewish National Fund, standing on the left—and other Zionist activists in Tetuan, 1921.

In the early and mid-1920s, Morocco received envoys from the Jewish National Fund and Keren Hayesod, Zionist organizations established in Europe fundraising to support and establish Jewish settlements in Palestine. Visitors included Avraham Elmalih, who represented the Sephardic Zionists in Jerusalem, as well as Nathan Halpern and Ariel Bension of Keren Hayesod. They encouraged Moroccan Zionists to set up more associations and intensify the activity of the existing ones, but they encountered difficulties in soliciting donations and support from Northern Moroccan Jews in cities such as Tetuan and Tangier. According to Ariel Bension, a Jewish Palestinian delegate of the Jewish Foundation Fund sent to Morocco, the main reasons for resistance to Zionism among Northern Moroccan Jews were that they saw it as an irreligious movement and not concerned with the interests of Sephardim. The Zionists in Spanish Morocco elected to send Ariel Bension as their delegate to the Twelfth Zionist Congress in 1921, marking the first time Moroccan Jews were represented at any Zionist Congress.

Samuel-Daniel Levy established the Société Maghen David for the propagation of Hebrew in 1920.

Zionism was met with disinterest in the early period in the north and its advocates had a difficult time garnering donations and support. It was seen as irreligious and that it did not consider the interests of the Sephardim. High Commissioner General José Sanjurjo and Plenipotentiary Minister Diego Saavedra were supportive, citing Spain's connection with the Sephardic Jews.

==== Colonial policy ====
In 1923, French colonial authorities allowed Zionists in Morocco to establish a Moroccan section to the Fédération sioniste de France, which acted as an umbrella organization for Zionist associations in the territory under French control and in Tangier.

Officially, French and Spanish colonial authorities held positions against Zionism in Morocco. The French shut down Or ha-Ma'arav, a Zionist paper published by the Hadida brothers in Casablanca and in May 1924 they banned the Zionist Organization's Hebrew publication ha-Olam. The French position against Zionism was not ideological (France supported the Balfour Declaration and the decisions made at the San Remo conference) as much as it was politically pragmatic due to pressure from the Muslim majority against the foreign propaganda.

=== 1930s ===
The urban, elite Moroccan Jews were divided on the question of Zionism: there were those formed by the AUI who were invested in the project of Westernization, Europeanization, and especially Gallicization who saw Zionism as an obstacle to achieving integration with the Europeans; there were those who supported modern secular Zionism; and there were those who favored a Jewish-Muslim alliance in Morocco, perhaps most pronounced in the organization al-Wifaq in the early 1950s. Newspapers partial to the cause disseminated Zionist information and propaganda: in the Spanish zone there was the Renacimiento de Israel and in the French zone there was the Casablanca newspaper L'Avenir Illustré (1926–1940)—established by Jonathan Thursz, a Polish Jew with a British passport who took it upon himself to represent Moroccan Jews at World Zionist Congresses (in 1925, 1931, 1938...). The Zionist press in Morocco was challenged by the AIU's L'Union Marocaine (1932–1940) and by Muhammad al-Kholti in the Moroccan nationalist newspaper L'Action du Peuple.

When a scouting group raised the Zionist flag in a parade in Tangier in 1934, the matter almost clashes between Muslims and Jews in the city.

There was an aliyah office established in Meknes in the mid-1930s and directed by Meir Amar to facilitate migration to Palestine with immigration certificates, but there was no substantial migration from Morocco at this time.

Newspapers partial to the Zionism disseminated information and propaganda: in the Spanish zone there was the Renacimiento de Israel and in the French zone there was the Casablanca newspaper L'Avenir Illustré (1926–1940)—established by Jonathan Thursz, a Polish Jew with a British passport. It was challenged by the AIU's L'Union Marocaine (1932–1940) and by Muhammad al-Kholti in the Moroccan nationalist newspaper L'Action du Peuple. Alliancistes, those affiliated with the Alliance Israélite Universelle (AIU) and saw the future of Moroccan Jews best served by Westernization, Europeanization, and especially Gallicization (for Spain there was Hispano - Hebrea), disagreed with Zionists, who favored leaving Morocco and abandoning the project of assimilation and adaption. Notable Alliancistes included Yaḥyā Zagury, inspector of Jewish institutions and a former employee of the French consulate. The Bulgarian Yomtob D. Sémach, AIU delegate in Morocco, also feared Zionist competition. Jacques Bigart, the AIU secretary-general in Paris, also shared these concerns. Zionists accused Alliancistes of compromising Jewish goals for the sake of French interests. The Moroccan nationalist movement, which espoused an Arab-Muslim vision of Morocco, resented both the assimilation of European values and culture of the Alliancistes as well as the project of the Zionists, siding with the Palestinians in their struggle against Jewish colonization and British rule.

=== 1940s ===
In the 1940s, Zionism started to attract a following beyond those Jews who had received a secular European education. Laskier cites a number of factors contributing to the spread of Zionism in Morocco in this decade: the attempts to achieve rights and emancipation for Jews in Morocco through Europeanization had not delivered results; France had not passed policies to remove Moroccan Jews from the legal jurisdiction of the Makhzen, nor did it automatically grant Moroccan Jews French citizenship, as they did to Algerian Jews through the Crémieux Decree. Poverty was widespread in the Moroccan city centers and in rural areas in the hinterland and Jewish Agency envoys, who penetrated Moroccan Jewish communities unofficially in 1944, would exploit this.

==== World War II ====
When the antisemitic Vichy regime took over France in World War II, it imposed restrictions and humiliations upon the Jews in Morocco as well. During the time in which the Vichy regime was in power in Morocco (from the summer of 1940 to the end of 1942), Zionist activity came to a lull. The Fédération sioniste de France —Section du Maroc ceased to function, and Zionist activists were unable to maintain communication channels with Zionists in Europe, Palestine, or other parts of Morocco. Samuel-Daniel Levy, the leading Zionist in Morocco at the time, reorganized Zionist activity in Morocco.

With the American invasion and presence in Morocco in Operation Torch in 1942, Moroccan Zionists established connections with American Jewish organizations including the American Jewish Joint Distribution Committee (JDC), Ozar Hatorah, and the Chabad-Lubavitch group, which opened religious schools in Morocco. With tacit encouragement for Moroccan independence from US President Franklin D. Roosevelt, who was in Morocco for the Casablanca Conference, the Moroccan nationalist movement was emboldened, or 'radicalized' according to Laskier, in its push for independence, which unsettled assimilationist and Zionist Jews.

The Vichy experience and the Holocaust strengthened the bonds felt between Moroccan Jews and European Jews. Whereas the AIU had been at times indifferent and at times hostile to Zionism, as a consequence of these developments, AIU leaders came to speak of the urgency of Jewish migration to Palestine and became more tolerant of Zionist activities, even collaborating with Zionists and Jewish Agency envoys.

==== 1948 Palestine War and the establishment of the State of Israel ====
The end of the Vichy period led to intensified Zionist activity in Morocco. The global Zionist movement had not been very interested in the Jews of Morocco until the establishment of the State of Israel in Palestine in 1948. Only from then was there significant Zionist emigration from Morocco. From 1947–1949 the Jewish Agency organized emigration, though it was illegal; prospective migrants caught attempting to cross the border into Algeria would be sent back. Clandestine migration through Algeria during the Palestine war led to the 1948 anti-Jewish riots in Oujda and Jerada in June.

Shay Hazkani writes that about 20,000 Moroccan Jews migrated to Israel in 1948–49, and there was a manifested desire to leave Israel and return to Morocco due to Ashkenazi racism, and that this urge was most apparent among the 645–1600 North Africans (most of whom were Moroccan) who fought in the Israeli military in the 1948 Palestine War. Based on their personal letters that were intercepted by the Israeli military postal censorship bureau, 70% of them wanted to return to their country of origin and warned their families not to come to Israel. Among those who weren't in the military, 60% were actively trying to return to their countries and 90% were urging their families not to come to Israel.

In the late 1940s, international Zionist youth social and scouting movements, including Dror, Habonim, Bnei Akiva, Gordonia, Hashomer Hatzair, Betar, etc., sought to expand and gain new members. These joined the previously existing AIU alumni clubs, the Charles Netter Association, named after Charles Netter, and the Ben-Yehuda movement, named after Eliezer Ben-Yehuda. The Tunisian youth movement Tzeirei-Zion also expanded into Morocco.

==== Cadima ====
Major Zionist emigration from Morocco began around the time of the establishment of the State of Israel in Palestine in 1948. Before the establishment of the state, the Zionist movement had not been very interested in the Jews of Morocco. The Jewish Agency, in its oversight of the migration of Moroccan Jews to Israel, had the support of the Department for Middle Eastern Jewry, a department created in 1948 for the facilitation of the migration of destitute Jews, as well as the Department of Noar ve-Hehalutz and secular and religious educational departments, which introduced Hebrew education in the schools of the AIU, Otzar Hatorah, and ORT.

The Caisse d’Aide aux Immigrants Marocains or Cadima (1949–1956), a Zionist migration apparatus administered by Jewish Agency and Mossad Le'Aliyah agents sent from Israel, was established through an agreement between Resident-General Alphonse Juin of the French colonial administration in Morocco and the Jewish Agency represented by Jacques Gershoni signed on March 7, 1949. By this agreement, the French colonial administration would no longer interfere in the emigration of Jews from Morocco as it had been doing previously, as long as it was done discretely and away from the attention of Sultan Muhammad V and the Moroccan nationalists.

Cadima was based out of a main office in Casablanca and opened cells in large cities throughout Morocco, operating under the guise of providing social services and a library. From these branches, they recruited Jews from rural areas and isolated villages and oversaw their departure. Initially, Mossad Le'Aliyah agents exploited poverty to motivate Jews to leave, though their economic situation would not significantly improve in Israel; most of the 30,000 Jews migrated between 1949 and 1951 were from poorer communities. It was based out of an office in Casablanca and operated cells in large cities as well as a transit camp along the road to al-Jadida, from which Jewish migrants would depart for Israel via Marseille. From mid-1951 to 1953, Cadima placed discriminatory restrictions on the migration of Moroccan Jews through the criteria of the seleqṣeya (Hebrew: סלקציה) that included a strict medical examination and privileged healthy young people and families with a breadwinner. From 1949 to 1956, Cadima, organized the migration of over 60,000 Moroccan Jews to Israel.

=== 1950s ===
==== al-Wifaq ====
The movement opposed to Zionism and in favor of a Muslim-Jewish coexistence, alliance, or entente in an independent Morocco reached its fullest expression in the early 1950s and culminating in the short-lived al-Wifaq (الوِفاق 'the agreement'). Figures associated with this movement included Marc Sabbah, Albert Aflalo, Armand Asoulin, Meyer Toledano, Meyer Ovadia, David Berdugo, Joseph Ohana, and Jacques Dahan. The AIU educator Charles Bensimhon was also in favor of entente. Pro-entente Moroccan Jews put faith in the tolerance of Sultan Muhammad V and sought out understandings with the Democratic Independence Party and the Istiqlal Party, both of which encouraged Jews to engage and participate in the creation of an independent, democratic Morocco.

Marc Sabbah, an associate of Mehdi Ben Barka's, was one of the most prominent voices of this movement. In response to an envoy of the World Jewish Congress in Morocco to negotiate for easing emigration policies in 1957, Marc Sabbah asked: "What right does this foreign organization have to speak on our behalf? We have no need for such intervention. We are Moroccans first and foremost, and only then Jews." He also criticized the Council of Jewish Communities of Morocco, calling its leaders passive consorts of the colonial past, accusing them of failing to alert the members of the Moroccan Jewish community to their rights, and calling for the reorganization of the Jewish communities.

The Wifaq movement had the support of some Jews who had received education in France as well as the strong opposition of others; there were very few of those who had less education who supported it. Critics of the movement saw it as elitist, exclusionary, and 'cut off from the mellah,' which is to say disconnected from Moroccan Jewish common folk.

The entente movement was mostly over by the end of the decade. Its leaders failed to attract the Jewish masses. For several Moroccan Jews, the uncertainty about what would happen with Moroccan independence in 1956 was a source of apprehension. There was a fear that independence might reduce them to their lower pre-colonial social, political, and economic status. Instead of taking that risk, tens of thousands decided to emigrate at this time. Morocco joined the Arab League in 1958, and many saw the country gravitating toward the Pan-Arab, anti-Israel politics of Gamal Abdel Nasser and perceived it as inauspicious or threatening.

Map of historical Jewish communities in Morocco, showing various rural communities.

==== ha-Misgeret 'The Framework' ====
In 1955, the Mossad, especially David Ben-Gurion and Isser Harel, established ha-Misgeret (המסגרת 'The Framework'), a clandestine, underground Zionist militia and organization in Morocco headed by Shlomo Havilio ('Louis'). Its agents were European and Israeli Jews, and it served as Mossad's base in Morocco. An 'Ulpan' kindergarten for teaching Hebrew in Casablanca established in 1954 by Yehudit Galili, an envoy of the Jewish Agency, would serve as a hiding place for weapons of ha-Misgeret. Galili herself would join and serve ha-Misgeret as a spy and recruiter. After Moroccan independence in 1956, through an agreement between Isser Harel of the Mossad and Shlomo Zalman Shragai of the Jewish Agency, the two organizations would organize the clandestine migration of Moroccan Jews by land and by sea.

==== Competing nationalisms: Zionism and the Moroccan nationalist movement ====
In the 1950s, Zionism competed with the Moroccan nationalist movement for the membership of the rural Jewish populations in regions such as the High Atlas, the Anti-Atlas, and the pre-Saharan southern oases. According to Aomar Boum, the religious and historical significance of Jerusalem to the observant Jews of the southern oases of the pre-Saharan region was important in their decision to make Aliyah. Moroccan nationalism and Zionism were not always mutually exclusive; Leon Benzaquen of Tangier was president of Keren Hayesod in Morocco and served as the first Jewish minister in the first independent Moroccan government in 1956, overseeing the Ministry of Post, Telegraph, and Telephone.

In addition to newspapers, radio, books, and lectures, the Zionist movement in Morocco harnessed cinema as a medium of propaganda in order to reach an audience that was largely illiterate. In 1959, Mohammed Abed al-Jabri responded to the phenomenon of Zionist cinema in a series of articles in the newspaper at-Tahrir of the National Union of Popular Forces (UNFP) decrying Zionist propaganda films depicting violence against Arabs screened in Morocco behind closed doors at functions and gatherings including weddings.

=== 1960s ===
In the summer of 1961, David Littman organized the clandestine migration of 530 Moroccan children to Israel with the help of the Œuvre de secours aux enfants (OSE) in Operation Mural, an operation led by the Mossad.

From 1961 to 1964, almost 90,000 Moroccan Jews were migrated to Israel in Operation Yachin, an Israeli-led initiative in which the Hebrew Immigrant Aid Society paid King Hassan II a sum per capita for each Moroccan Jew who migrated to Israel.

=== 1970s ===
The Moroccan state got involved in the Arab–Israeli conflict when it sent a nominal force to fight against Israel in the 1973 War.

=== 2020s ===
==== Abraham Accords ====
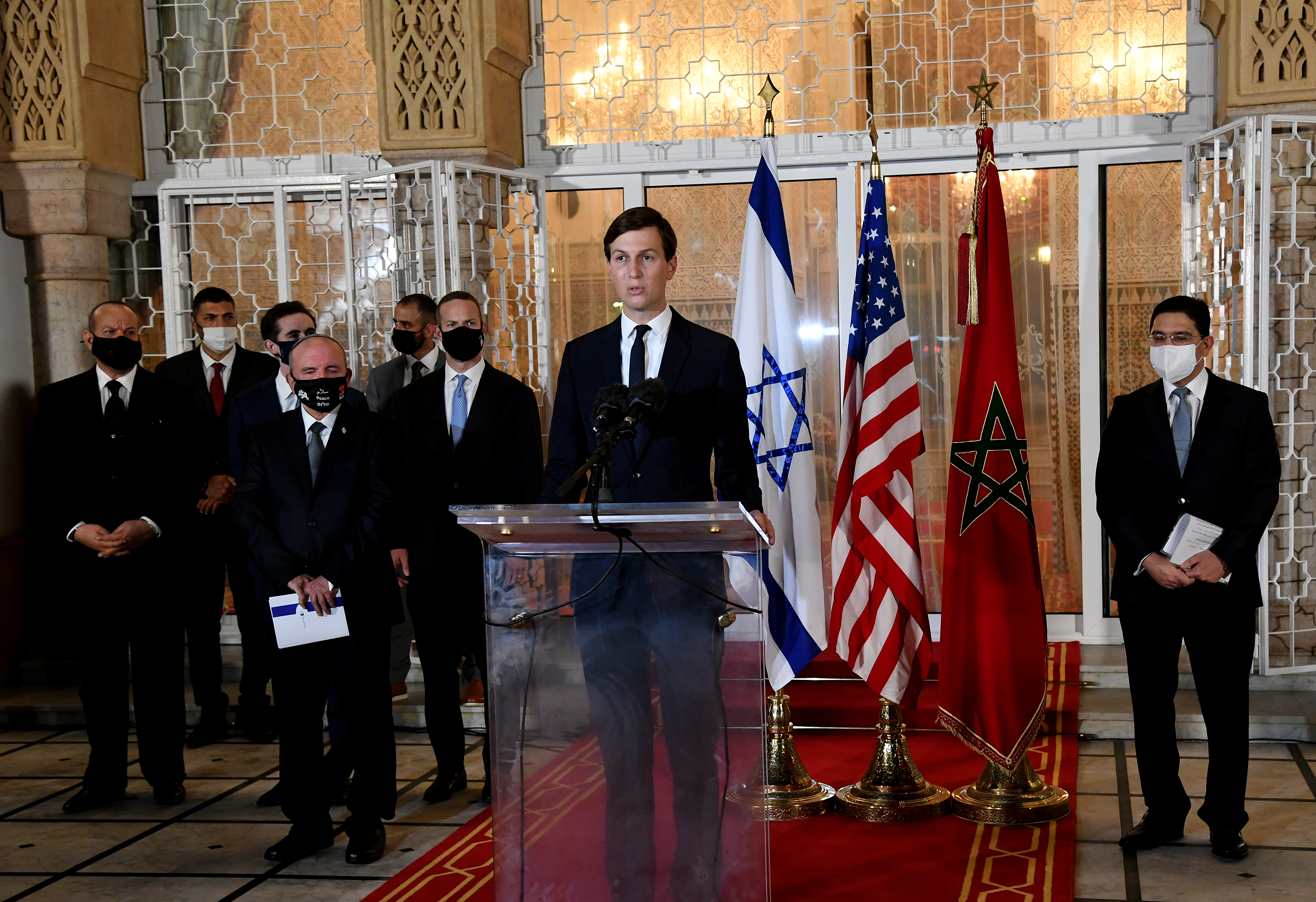
Jared Kushner, son-in-law of President Donald Trump and then-senior advisor to him as well, speaking in a joint U.S.–Israeli delegation to Morocco, December 2020.

In 2020, Morocco formally normalized relations with the State of Israel when it joined the Abraham Accords, a series of normalization agreements brokered by the United States during the first presidency of Donald Trump. In exchange, Israel and the US announced they would recognize Moroccan rule over the Western Sahara. In November 2021, Israeli Defense Minister Benny Gantz visited Morocco and signed a military agreement with his Moroccan counterpart Abdellatif Loudiyi.

==== Gaza War ====
Morocco has been the site of anti-Zionist protest activity during the Gaza War and the humanitarian crisis scholars have described as genocide.

Ismail Lghazaoui, a Moroccan activist and Boycott, Divestment and Sanctions (BDS) member, was taken into detention 16 November 2025. He was released on 5 February 2025.

On 11 August 2025, following significant protest activity from BDS Morocco targeting Maersk shipping activity in Moroccan ports, Sion Assidon, prominent anti-Zionist Moroccan activist, was discovered unconscious with head injuries in his home in Mohammedia.

== Criticism of Zionism in Morocco ==
=== Jewish Moroccan critics of Zionism ===
Yahia Zagury, adviser to French Résident Général in Morocco Hubert Lyautey and inspector of Jewish institutions (1919–1937) under colonial rule, fully agreed with Lyautey's opposition to Zionism and told him, “it would be in our highest interest to keep watch and to discreetly prevent any Zionist propagandizing in Morocco.” Zagury declined to intervene with the French colonial authorities on behalf of the Hadida brothers, publishers of the Zionist publication Or ha-Ma'arav, to allow them to establish a Zionist society in Morocco, and Joseph H. Lévy, an affiliate of the Maccabean Land Company of London who had gone to Fes to distribute Zionist literature and sell land in Palestine to some Fessi Jews, accused Zagury of "attempting to destroy our movement."

Abraham Serfaty of Ila al-Amam and Souffles-Anfas was a vociferous critic of Zionism. In 1969, in the aftermath of the Arab defeat in the 1967 War and with Serfaty on the editorial board, Souffles published a special 15th edition dedicated to Palestine entitled "Pour la révolution palestinienne" ("For the Palestinian Revolution"), marking a new direction for the magazine. In this edition, Serfaty wrote an article entitled "Moroccan Jewry and Zionism" in which the author called on Moroccan Jews to condemn the Israeli state and accused Zionism and French colonial divide-and-rule politics, with attention to the AIU, for sowing discord between Jews and Arabs.

Edmond Amran El Maleh was a fierce critic of Zionism and the State of Israel. In his 1977 essay "Juifs marocains et Marocains juifs" published in Les Temps modernes, El Maleh articulated his rejection of claims Albert Memmi advanced in his 1974 book Juifs et Arabes, with El Maleh arguing that the deterioration of Moroccan Jewish communities was a result of French colonial ideology and Zionist propaganda as well as Israeli expansionism after 1948. In works of fiction written from his exile in Paris from 1965, El Maleh sought to undermine Zionist narratives about Muslims and Jews in the Maghreb as well as in Palestine-Israel.

=== Muslim Moroccan critics of Zionism ===
Abdelkebir Khatibi published a polemic critical of Zionism in 1974 entitled Vomito blanco: le sionisme et la conscience malheureuse (White vomit: Zionism and unhappy consciousness), in which he focused primarily on Zionist ideology and the French left's support for it. In it, he employed his 'double critique,' rejecting Jean-Paul Sartre's 'conditional Zionism' and the 'impasse' of Albert Memmi's anticolonial Zionism, as well as criticizing Arab regimes and Arab ethnonationalism.

== Leaders of the Zionist movement in Morocco ==
Leading activists of the Zionist movement in Morocco included:

- Samuel-Daniel Levy (Tetuan)
- Jonathan Thursz (Poland)
- Judah Leon Jalfón (Tetuan)
- Dr Zeimig Spivacoff (Russia)
- Anshel Perl (Poland)
- Salomon Kagan (Russia)
- Moïse Azencot (Tangier)
- Haim Toledano (Tangier)
- Abraham Laredo (Fez)
