= Yahia Zagury =

Moroccan Jewish community leader

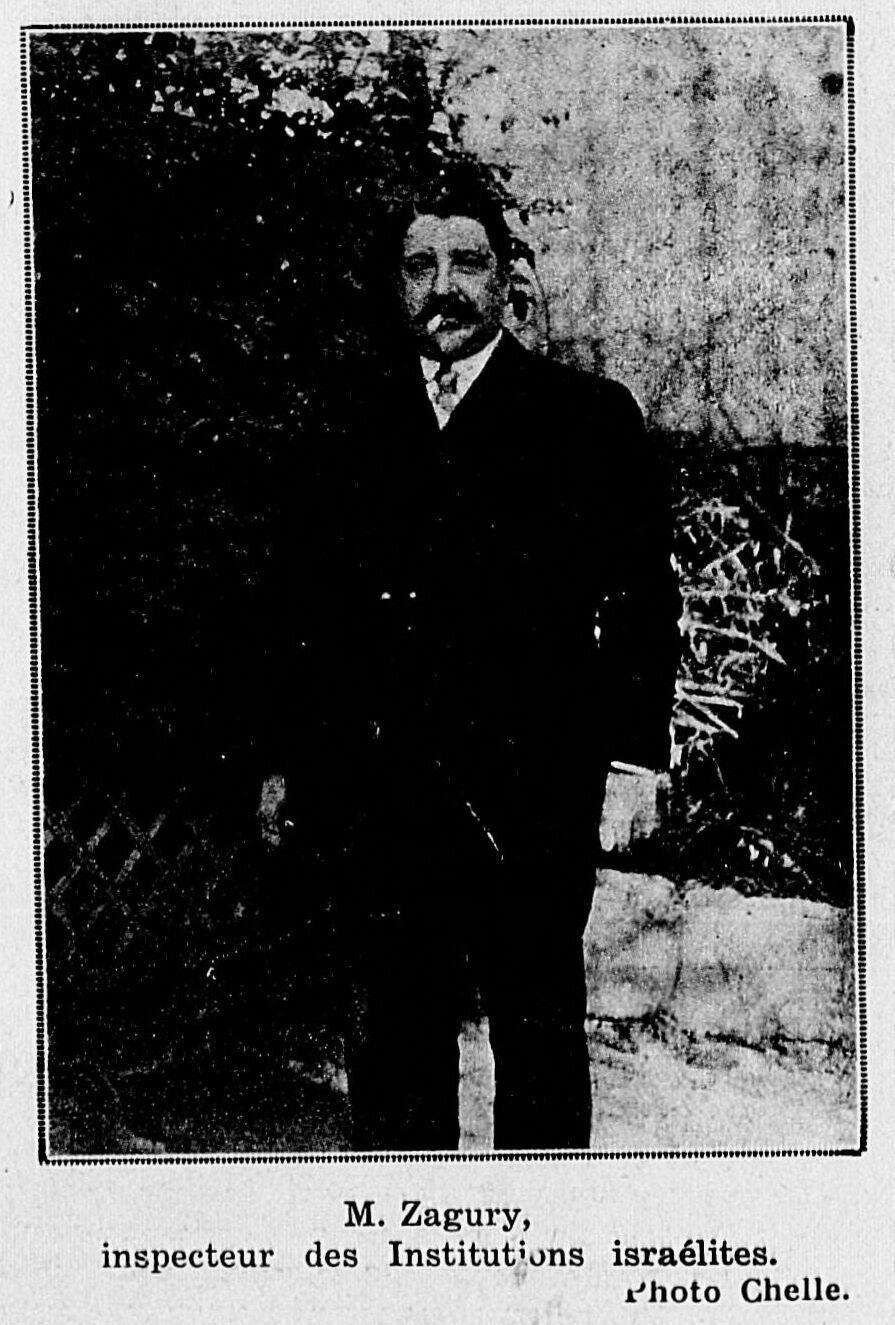
- Yahia Zagury in L'Afrique du Nord illustrée in 1930
- Born: 1878; Casablanca, Morocco
- Died: 1959 (aged 80–81)

Yahia Zagury (Arabic: يحيى زاڭوري, romanized: Yaḥyā Zagūry; Hebrew: יחיא זאגורי; 1878–1959) was a leader of the Jewish community in Morocco, adviser to French Résident Général in Morocco Hubert Lyautey, and inspector of Jewish institutions (1919–1937) under French colonial rule. He supported French rule in Morocco and opposed Zionism.

== Biography ==
He was born in Casablanca in 1878. He worked as a tarjuman in the French consulate in Casablanca. In 1907, in the French bombardment and invasion of Casablanca, Zagury guided French forces through the medina to the French consulate, where Europeans had taken refuge and were under siege. Zagury was then decorated with the Legion of Honour, accorded French citizenship, and appointed as an advisor to résident général Hubert Lyautey. A French colonial policy reorganizing the Jewish communities in Morocco passed as two ḍahīrs on May 22, 1918 established local Jewish councils and committees modeled after those existing in France as well as a centralized rabbinical court located in Rabat. Zagury was involved in these changes and took the position of inspector general of Jewish institutions, created on June 23, 1919, which reported to the French Protectorate's Directorate of Indigenous Affairs. He occupied this post from 1919 to 1937.

At the beginning of WWII, he and the Bulgarian Yomtob D. Sémach, Alliance Israélite Universelle delegate in Morocco, sought to get German Jewish refugees interned by the French colonial authorities as enemy foreign nationals released, but without success. They also attempted to get the approval of the French colonial authorities for Moroccan Jewish volunteers to join the French war effort, but this too was denied.

In March 1941, Vichy France established a Commissariat-General for Jewish Affairs led by the French antisemite and Nazi collaborator Xavier Vallat. On June 2, it published the second law on the status of Jews, which sought to exclude Jews from economic life. It put into effect a numerus clausus in the liberal professions of medicine, pharmacy, and the bar, as well as at universities and grandes écoles, and prescribed a census of Jews in the Zone libre. The new status applied in Algeria, and Vallat also wanted to extend it to Morocco and Tunisia, which were then French protectorates and therefore legally sovereign. Monitoring the situation, Zagury and the leaders of other major Jewish communities in Morocco—Albert Amiel in Rabat, Ben Sion Hayot in Salé, and Joseph Berdugo in Meknes—addressed résident général Charles Noguès expressing their concern.

After the war, Zagury assumed the presidency of the committee of the Jewish community of Casablanca and held the post until his death in 1959.

== Views ==
Zagury supported the Alliance Israélite Universelle, the assimilation of the elite of Morocco's Jews into French culture, and their acquisition of French citizenship.

Zagury, like Lyautey and the French colonial administration, was opposed to Zionism and advised Lyautey in September 1919 that “it would be in our highest interest to keep watch and to discreetly prevent any Zionist propagandizing in Morocco.” The Hadida brothers, publishers of the Zionist publication Or ha-Ma'arav, asked Zagury to intervene with the French colonial authorities on their behalf to allow them to establish a Zionist society, but Zagury declined. Joseph H. Lévy, an affiliate of the Maccabean Land Company of London who had gone to Fes to distribute Zionist literature and sell land in Palestine to some Fessi Jews, accused Zagury of "attempting to destroy our movement."

L'Union Marocaine (1932–1940), a francophone publication, was established in Casablanca to speak for Zagury and other alliancistes, Jewish notables who supported the Alliance Israélite Universelle and opposed Zionism.
