= Samuel-Daniel Levy =

- Samuel-Daniel Lévy
- Born: December 4, 1874; Tetuan
- Died: 1970; Casablanca

Samuel-Daniel Lévy (4 December 1874, Tetuan–1970, Casablanca) was a businessman, organizer, and leading advocate of Zionism in Morocco. He held British citizenship.

== Biography ==
Levy was born to a Sephardic family in Tetuan in 1874 and studied at that city's school of the Alliance Israélite Universelle (AIU). He was chosen by Abraham Ribbi, director of the school in Tetuan, to attend the École Normale israélite Orientale, a teachers’ training school in Paris founded by the Alliance Israélite Universelle. He graduated in 1893 and became schoolmaster in Tunis. He later moved to Sousse and Tangier. He was made director of the Alliance school in Casablanca (1900–1902), where he established a school for girls. He moved to Argentina and directed Jewish Colonisation Association schools in the province of Buenos Aires.

He returned to Casablanca in 1913 and engaged in work for the Jewish communities in Morocco. His work was supported by international Jewish organizations including the Organization for Rehabilitation through Training (ORT), the Œuvre de secours aux enfants, and the American Jewish Joint Distribution Committee.

He visited Palestine in 1935 and returned with renewed commitment to Zionism.

He led a number of initiatives, such as the establishment with the Council of Jewish Communities of Morocco of the Sanatorium Israélite Ben Ahmed, a sanatorium dedicated to Jewish patients in Ben Ahmed, and a program to systematically diagnose tuberculosis. He also established a number of Zionist and Jewish philanthropic associations and local branches of foreign associations, including Société Maghen David, ORT Moroc and OSE Maroc.

== Zionism ==
Samuel-Daniel Lévy is considered the leading advocate of Zionism in Morocco. He was committed to Zionism early on, already a member of several Zionist cells by 1913. He established Zionist branches in all of the main cities in Morocco and propagated Theodor Herzl's ideology through a network of synagogues, through cultural associations (especially the Société Maghen David ), and through publications (especially L'Avenir Illustré). He facilitated collecting the Zionist shekel and helped fundraise for the Jewish National Fund and Keren Hayesod. He also organized visits from rabbis and lectures from speakers from Palestine and other places. He visited Palestine in 1935 and returned with renewed commitment to Zionism. He was further inspired by the election of the pro-Zionist Léon Blum as Prime Minister of France in 1936.

== Views ==
The historian Mohammed Kenbib notes that "he took tremendous pride in the contribution of Jews, and especially of Sephardic Jews, to world civilization." In a speech to the AIU alumni association in Tangier in 1896, Lévy told the audience that Jewish intellectual superiority was a source of jealousy for Christians and Muslims.

At the 1944 World Zionist Congress in Atlantic City, New Jersey, he expressed gratitude to France for its mission civilisatrice.

On his Zionism, Kenbib notes that "Lévy felt that the Jewish dimension of Moroccan history represented an uninterrupted pattern of oppression, marginalization, and suffering, and that the Arabs had to be expelled by force from the Holy Land."
