= Arthur Benham =

English playwright

- Born: 1871 or 1872
- Died: 8 September 1895 (aged 23); Brighton, England

Arthur Benham (c. 1872 – 8 September 1895) was an English playwright.

He was born into a Jewish family, the son of Henry Benham. His sister was the actress Estelle Burney, who collaborated in his plays, and another sibling, Charles Benham, wrote the novel The Fourth Napoleon (1897).

Benham was a dramatist of considerable promise, and was the author of The County and The Awakening—the latter produced for a short run at the Garrick Theatre, and the former at Terry's Theatre. He was also a member of the Maccabæans.

He died of tuberculosis at the age of twenty-three, leaving behind several unfinished works.
