= Frederic Matys Thursz =

- Born: 1930-07-07; Casablanca, Morocco
- Died: 1992-07-04; Cologne, Germany
- Occupations: artist, teacher
- Children: 4
- Father: Jonathan Thursz

Frederic Matys Thursz (1930–1992) was a jewish Moroccan abstract painter and teacher. He was active in the United States and France. His paintings have been shown at the Galerie Lelong, Jefferson Place Gallery, and in the Documenta 9 exhibition.

== Career ==
Frederic Matys Thursz was born in Casablanca on July 7, 1930 and he moved to the United States with his parents in 1941. Thursz received his BFA degree from Queens College in 1953, his MFA degree from Columbia University in 1955. He did doctoral studies in art history at Institut d'Art et d'Archéologie in Paris, France.

In 1978 he founded the group "Radical Painting" with Jerry Zeniuk, Joseph Marioni, Günther Umberg, Erik Saxon, and Marcia Hafif, among others.

Thursz taught at University of Kentucky from 1958 to 1968, and at Aspen School of Contemporary Art from 1967 to 1969. He taught at Kingsborough Community College (CUNY) from 1968 to1991; where he was chairman of the Art Department. From 1978 to 1988, he taught at the New York Studio School of Drawing, Painting and Sculpture.

== Personal life ==
He was married three times, Miryam Neulander, Teresea Bennett, Nina Lunenborg Thursz. He had four children. Thursz lived in Paris, France until his death in 1992.

He died of complications after heart surgery on July 4, 1992 in Cologne, Germany. He had held an art studio in Ossining, New York, until his death.
