= La Voix des communautés =

Monthly francophone publication

La Voix des communautés ("The Voice of the Communities") was a monthly francophone publication of the Conseil des Communautés Israélites du Maroc (CCIM) published February 1, 1950 - 1 October 1963 out of Rabat.

== History ==
The Conseil des Communautés Israélites du Maroc was established in 1947 during the French protectorate in Morocco, within the context of the colonial government's reforms attempting to quell the Jewish youth leadership's calls for democracy and self-expression. The French placed Jewish supporters loyal to them, such as Jacques Dahan, at the leadership of the publication, mediating between the interests of the French government and the Jewish community. It represented mainstream views of the Westernized class of Moroccan Jews.

The leadership of the council was replaced in 1956 with the end of the French protectorate, and La Voix des communautés was not published for a period of five years. In 1961, with the coronation of Hassan II, David Amar assumed leadership of the council. This period coincided with Operation Yachin, when the majority of Moroccan Jews migrated to Israel. Two main themes of the publication in this period are loyalty to Morocco and its royal family and upholding the equality of Jews as citizens.

In response to the efforts of al-Wifaq, to promote Arabic literacy and use among Moroccan Jews to prepare them for "the responsibilities of citizenship in independent Morocco," La Voix des communautés published an edition with an Arabic supplement, but just once.
