= Ian Gainsford =

Sir Ian Derek Gainsford (né Ginsberg; born 24 June 1930) is a British retired dentist and academic. He was dean of King's College School of Medicine and Dentistry, King's College London (1988–1997) and vice-principal of King's College London (1994–1997). He was president of the Maccabaeans, a friendly society.

== Career ==
- Junior Staff, King’s College Hospital, 1955–57
- Member of staff, Dept of Conservative Dentistry, London Hospital Medical School, 1957–70
- Senior Lecturer/Consultant, Dept of Conservative Dentistry, KCH, 1970–97
- Deputy Dean of Dental Studies, 1973–77; Dir of Clinical Dental Services, KCH, 1977–87 (Dean of Dental Studies, KCH Medical School, 1977–83)
- Dean, Faculty of Clinical Dentistry, KCL, 1983–87

== Other positions ==
- President, British Society for Restorative Dentistry, 1973–74
- Member: BDA, 1956– (President, Metropolitan Branch, 1981–82)
- President, American Dental Society of London, 1982)
- President, Western Marble Arch Synagogue, 1998–2000
- Honorary President, British Friends of Magen David Adom, 1995–

He wrote the standard textbook Silver Amalgam in Clinical Practice (1965, 3rd edn 1992)

== Honours ==
- Fellow in Dental Surgery of the Royal College of Surgeons, 1967
- Fellow in Dental Surgery of the Royal College of Surgeons of Edinburgh, 1998
- He was knighted in 1995.
