= Pinhas Khalifa Ha-Cohen Azogh =

Moroccan rabbi and activist

Pinhas Khalifa Ha-Cohen Azzogh (בינחס כליפא הכהן אזוג; died 12 January 1952), also known as Baba Pinhas, was a Moroccan rabbi born in Tarudant. He was an early Zionist activist in Morocco, involved in distributing literature, fundraising, and selling plots of land in Palestine to Moroccan Jews.

== Name ==
Azzogh, meaning 'great' in Berber languages, is an honorific title for a renowned saint.

== Biography ==
He is the grandson of the Kabbalist and rabbi David Ben Baruch Ha-Cohen Azog. He went to Marrakesh from Tarudant, apparently just before getting involved in Zionist activity. In March of 1919, Rabbi Pinhas Khalifa Ha-Cohen Azogh assumed leadership of a Zionist office in Marrakesh, from which leaflets from the Fédération sioniste de France were translated into Arabic and distributed, and from which Zionist fundraising efforts were organized. Rabbi Pinhas Cohen collected money from the Jews in Marrakesh and in April, May, and June expanded his fundraising to Jewish communities in the Sus region south of Mogador. He sent the money collected, about 2000 francs, from the Jews of Marrakesh to the Jewish National Fund bureau in Paris, at which time he also made contact with the Zionist Organization (ZO). Through the Maccabean Land Company, Cohen also sold 36 plots of land in Palestine to Jews in Morocco, who were told years later when they attempted to move and settle there that the land had been reserved for Eastern European Jews to settle.

In June 1920, he visited Casablanca and entered into direct contact with the London office of the ZO and began to act on its behalf, focusing more on organizing than fundraising. He asked that his correspondences with the London office be in French, though it appears he did not speak it fluently. He would submit reports and once included a blessing in Hebrew for the King of England, which he asked to be translated and given to him, on behalf of himself and the whole hevra.

While in contact with the ZO office in London, he sold more than 1000 Zionist shekels—the annual ZO membership dues. This brought 729 new members, "mostly artisans and poor people" in Cohen's own words, into the Organization, with 338 of them in Marrakesh, 205 in surrounding villages, 64 in Tarudant, and 122 elsewhere in the Sus. ZO President Chaim Weizmann sent Cohen a personal thank-you letter.

== As a saint ==
There are tales and legends of Cohen having performed miracles and saving the life of Thami El Glaoui, pacha of Marrakesh in the colonial period.
