= Or ha-Ma'arav =

Jewish monthly newspaper

אור המערב (Or ha-Maʿarav) La Lumière du Maroc
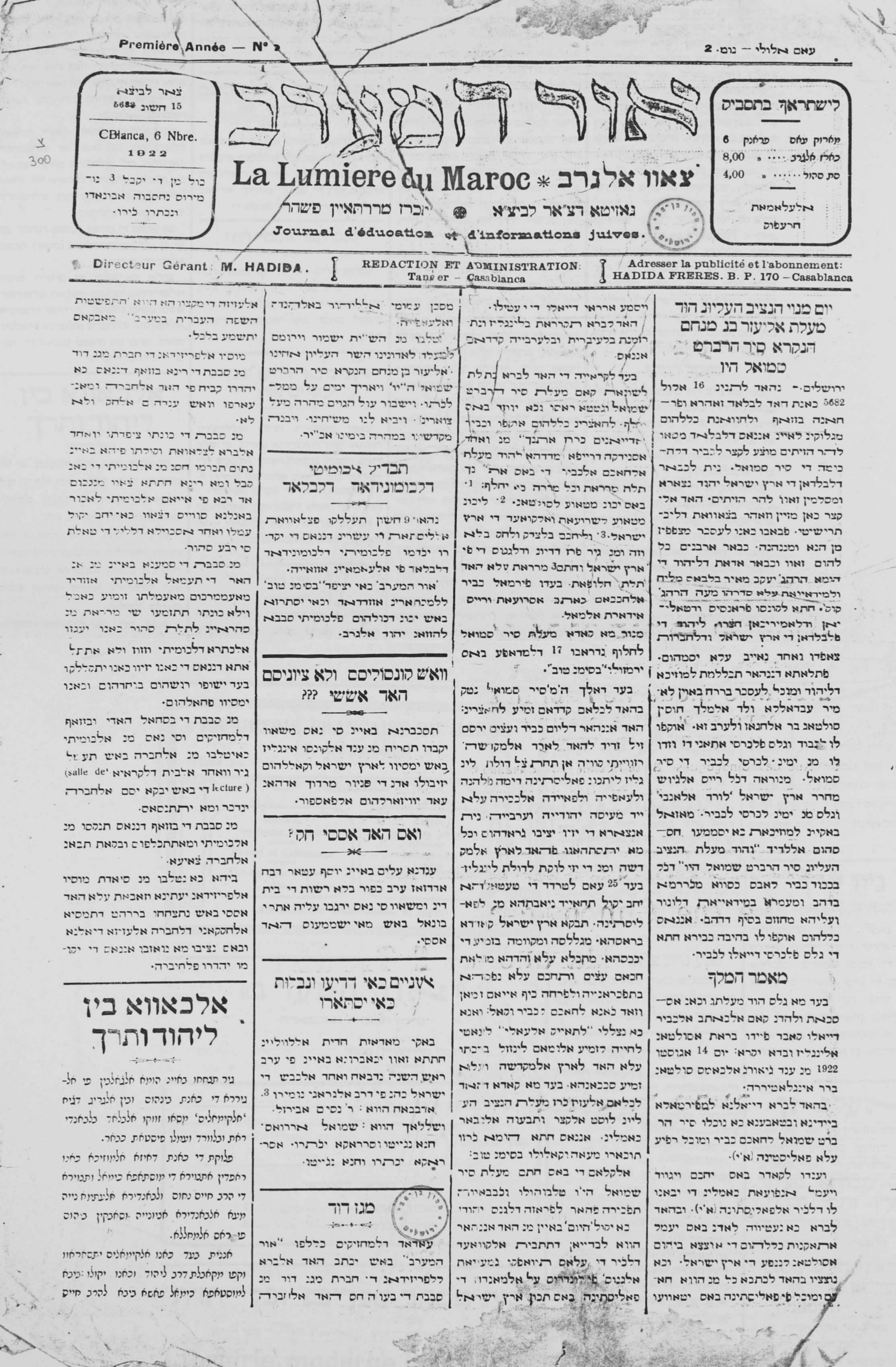
- First issue of Or ha-Maʻarav, written in Moroccan Darija with Hebrew script.

Or ha-Maʿarav (Hebrew: אור המערב, lit. 'Western Light') or La Lumière du Maroc was a Jewish monthly newspaper published in Judeo-Arabic by the Hadida brothers from 1922 to 1924 in Casablanca, Morocco. Its editorial line was Zionist. It was closed by the French authorities.

== See also ==
- L'Avenir Illustré
