= Mohamed Hassan Ouazzani =

Moroccan politician

- محمد بن الحسن الوزاني
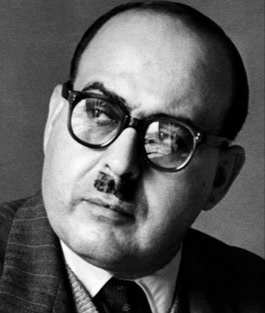
- Born: 17 January 1910; Fez, Morocco
- Died: 9 September 1978 (aged 68); Fez, Morocco
- Political party: Democratic Independence Party

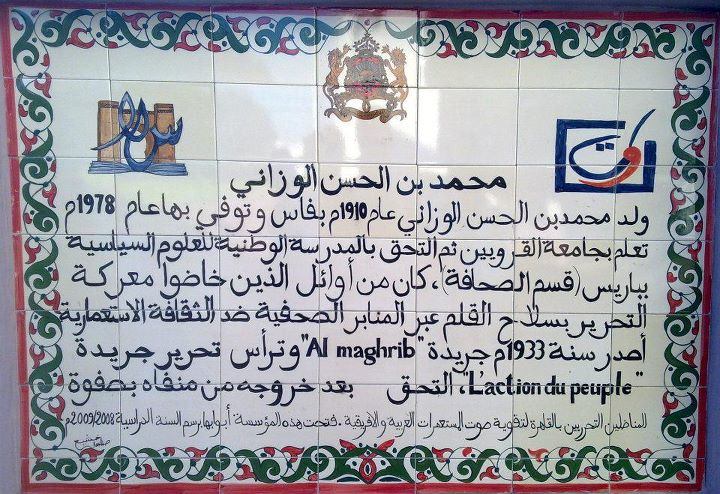
Banner at a high school in Salé, with a short biography of Mohamed Belhassan Wazzani.

Mohamed Hassan Ouazzani (Arabic: محمد بن الحسن الوزاني; 17 January 1910 – 9 September 1978) was a Moroccan journalist and politician, one of the main leaders of the Moroccan nationalist movement, founder of the L'Action du Peuple newspaper and of the Democratic Independence Party.

== Early life ==
Mohamed Hassan Ouazzani was born in 1910 in Fez, and grew up in his hometown, studying at the University of al-Qarawiyyin. In 1927, he went to Paris to pursue his studies in political sciences. In 1933, he founded the nationalist French-speaking newspaper L'Action du Peuple, which was the first anti-colonial French-speaking newspaper in Morocco.

== Political life ==
In 1934, Wazzani started his activity in the Moroccan nationalist movement, of which he was one of the leaders together with Allal al-Fassi. In 1937, and after a disagreement with Al Fassi, Wazzani distanced himself from Al Fassi and founded a separate movement. In the same year, he was arrested by the French and exiled to the Sahara, where he remained until 1946.

In 1946, and upon his return from exile, he went to Casablanca and founded the Democratic Independence Party, asking for the full independence of Morocco and for the implementation of a constitution based on a constitutional monarchy.

In 1960, and after Morocco's independence, Wazzani became a minister of state in the government.

In 1971, and after the 1971 coup attempt, Wazzani lost his right hand, and learned to write with his left hand.

Mohamed Belhassan Wazzani died in Fez on 9 September 1978.
