= Jonathan Thursz =

Polish-born Jewish community leader

- Born: 10 April 1895; Poland
- Died: 2 May 1976 (aged 81); Baltimore, United States
- Occupations: Journalist, Zionist activist, Diplomat, Intelligence officer.
- Spouse: Frajdla "Franka" Cutglas
- Children: Frederic Matys Thursz Daniel Thursz

Jonathan Thursz (1895 – 1976) was a Jewish Polish-born Zionist and community leader active in Casablanca, Morocco, who founded L’Avenir Illustré in 1926, the first long-lasting Jewish newspaper in the country..

== Early life and education ==
Born in Poland in 1895, Thursz spent his formative years in Belgium and England, receiving his education in these European countries.

== Career in Morocco ==
In 1923, Thursz established a Zionist cell of local activists in Casablanca. He promoted Zionism and conducted fundraising for various organizations, such as Keren Hayesod and Jewish National Fund. He also promoted the World Zionist Organization (WZO), encouraging the acquisition of the Zionist Shekel. The acquisition of a Zionist Shekel meant becoming a member of WZO and gave voting rights to its holders.

In 1926, Thursz founded and edited L'Avenir Illustré (The Illustrated Future), a francophone Jewish periodical that became the first long-lasting Jewish newspaper in Morocco. The targeted audience was the european educated and affluent urban Jewish population, particularly francophone graduates of Alliance Israélite Universelle schools.

From 1933, Thursz worked as a correspondent for Associated Press in Marocco.

=== Zionist activities and representation ===
By 1927, he had settled permanently in Casablanca, Morocco, under the French protectorate. Thursz served as the represensative of the Zionist Executive in Marocco until 1941. He was a delegate from Morocco to multiple World Zionist Congresses, including the 14th, 16th, 17th, 18th, 19th, 20th, and 21st congresses.

He also served as secretary-general of the Executive Commission of the Zionist Federation of France (Morocco Section) and was a member of the Administrative Commission of the Refugee Committee created in Casablanca in July 1940. As part of his publicizing activities, Thursz translated several of Theodor Herzl's works from German into French, helping to disseminate Zionist literature to francophone audiences.

=== Wartime exile and service ===
Thursz evaded an imminent arrest by the Vichy Regime in July 1941, successfully fleeing with his family to the USA. He was up to that point heading the refugee committee of the Jewish community in Casablanca. In New York, he worked as an editor of the Jewish Mirror.

Thursz joined both the U.S. Office of War Information and the Office of Strategic Services (OSS), precursor organization of the Central Intelligence Agency.

=== US diplomatic service ===
After the war, Thursz joined the U.S. State Department, where he specialized in foreign affairs.His expertise in North African affairs and multilingual capabilities made him a valuable asset in America's post-war diplomatic efforts.

=== McCarthyist persecution ===
In 1953, Thursz faced a significant crisis when he was suspended from his State Department position and subsequently terminated during Senator Joseph McCarthy's anti-Communist investigations. Thursz's name appeared on McCarthy's lists of alleged security risks in government

Thursz fought the charges against him and was ultimately vindicated. Three years later, he was cleared of all allegations and reinstated to his State Department position with full back pay. He continued his diplomatic service until reaching the mandatory retirement age of 70 for civil service employees.

=== Later life (1965-1976) ===
Following his retirement from the State Department, Thursz dedicated the final decade of his life to research on African countries. He divided his time between Baltimore and Israel, pursuing scholarly work that drew upon his extensive experience in North African affairs.

Jonathan Thursz died on March 16, 1976, at Sinai Hospital in Baltimore at the age of 81. His funeral service was conducted by Rabbi Levy Smolar, president of Baltimore Hebrew College

== Personal life ==
Jonathan Thursz was married to Frajdla "Franka" Cutglas (sometimes spelled Gutglass). They had two sons, Professor Daniel Thursz (1929-2000) and artist Frederic Matys Thursz (1930–1992).
