= Serge Berdugo =

Moroccan politician

Serge Berdugo (born 26 November 1937) is a Moroccan lawyer and politician who served as Minister of Tourism for both Prime Ministers Mohammed Karim Lamrani and Abdellatif Filali between 1993 and 1995. Berdugo is a leader within the Moroccan Jewish community, serving as Secretary-General of the Israelite Community Council of Morocco and President of the Israelite Community of Casablanca.

== Biography ==
Serge Berdugo was born on 26 November 1937 in Meknes. A Moroccan Jew, his ancestors came to Morocco from Portugal in 1492 during the Portuguese Inquisition. From 1964 to 1977, he worked as the spokesperson for the National Bank of Economic Development (BNDE). In 1977 Berdugo became Vice President of External Relations for the Israelite Community Council, becoming its president ten years later. That title includes serving as the head of the World Union of Moroccan Judaism. In his role, he has worked for better integration of Moroccan Jews into larger Moroccan society as well as the renovation of Jewish community institutions. Under his presidency, he created the Foundation for Moroccan Jewish Heritage with the objective of restoring Jewish historical sites in Morocco, as well as the creation of the Moroccan Jewish Museum in Casablanca.

A fierce supporter of interfaith dialogue and peace in the Middle East, he has worked closely on ways to promote reconciliation between Israelis and Palestinians.

In 1992, Berdugo worked with the Moroccan government and the Monarchy to have the bodies of those who died in the shipwreck of the Egoz buried in Israel.

In 1993, he was named Minister of Tourism by King Hassan II in the Cabinet of Mohammed Karim Lamrani. He continued in this role in 1994 in the government of Abdellatif Filali. In 1995, Berdugo was named Commander of the Order of the Throne, becoming the first Moroccan Jew to receive the distinction.

Since March 2006, Berdugo has served as an at-large ambassador on behalf of the King of Morocco.
