= Erik Saxon =

American contemporary artist

- Born: 1941 (age 84–85); San Francisco, California
- Education: University of California, Berkeley (B.A., M.A.)
- Occupations: Visual artist, painter, printmaker
- Years active: 1968–present
- Style: Geometric abstraction
- Movement: Radical Painting Group

Erik Saxon (born 1941) is an American visual artist, painter, and printmaker based in New York, whose work is associated with contemporary abstraction. During the late 1970s and 1980s, Saxon was a member of the Radical Painting Group, an artist collective established by Marcia Hafif and Olivier Mosset in New York, which focused on exploring the essential qualities of painting.

Saxon's art often references both the internal geometry of shapes and the external geometry of the picture plane, employing forms such as squares, circles, and crosses. His work is part of the permanent collections of museums in the U.S. and abroad, including the Museum of Modern Art in New York and the National Gallery of Art in Washington, D.C. In addition to his career as an artist, Saxon has also written on abstract art and has been a contributing author to Artforum.

== Life and career ==
Born in San Francisco, Saxon received a B.A. and M.A. in studio art from the University of California, Berkeley. In 1968, he moved to New York where he experimented with various abstract and figurative styles. By 1973, Saxon had committed fully to non-representational art. Between 1974 and 1977, the artist produced the first series of geometrical grid paintings which would inform his later experiments in abstraction.

Photograph showing members of the Radical Painting Group c. 1980 in New York with Erik Saxon on the far left.

=== Radical Painting Group ===
By the late 1970s, Saxon had joined the Radical Painting Group, an artist collective founded by Marcia Hafif and Olivier Mosset in New York. The group became known for creating monochrome paintings, and participating artists were "concerned with the material essence of painting and the participation of the viewer in its experience". Other group members included Günter Umberg, Joseph Marioni, Phil Sims, Dale Henry, Doug Sanderson, Susanna Tanger, Jerry Zeniuk, and Frederic Matys Thursz. In 1982, Saxon produced the first all-white painting, following the earlier art historical precedents of all-white compositions by the Russian avant-garde painter Kazimir Malevich and the American post-war artist Robert Rauschenberg.

In his work as a painter and a writer, Saxon is said to have focused primarily on the "ideas of pure abstract art". Art historian Kavie Barnes notes that Saxon is "quite self-conscious about such issues as authenticity in his personal practice and his relationship to the history of art". According to the critic Sarah Schmerler, who suggested similarities between Minimalism and Saxon's work, the artist is not in favor of following "strict chronology" and each of his paintings is distinguished by its own "perceptual logic" and intensive labor, prompting in turn a "long and deep contemplation" from the spectator. Akin to the Minimalists, as Schmerler points out, Saxon is particular about the specific placement of his works in relation to the viewer. When discussing his own practice and interest in geometry, the artist has pointed to his sustained engagement with the plane, including the "interior plane" of a geometrical shape and the "picture plane" of a painting, while emphasizing the relevance of "primal forms", including a square, circle, and a cross among others.

=== Exhibitions and collections ===
He has participated in solo and group exhibitions at Newspace Los Angeles, Galerie L’A in Liege, Belgium, Georgia Museum of Art in Athens, Georgia, Bowdoin College Museum of Art in Brunswick, Maine, Cincinnati Museum of Art, Wilhelm-Hack Museum in Ludwigshafen, Germany, Kunstverein Arnsberg in Germany, Mondriaanhuis in Amersfoort, Netherlands, Museum of Modern Art in Belgrade, Serbia, Museo de Arte Contemporaneo Esteban Vicente in Segovia, Spain, and Museo Cantonale d’Arte in Lugano, Switzerland, among other venues across Europe and the United States. Saxon's work is in permanent collections of several American and European institutions including the Museum of Modern Art in New York, the National Gallery of Art in Washington, DC, Yale University Art Gallery in New Haven, Harvard Art Museums/Fogg Art Museum in Cambridge, Massachusetts, Göteborgs Museum of Art in Sweden, and Museo Cantonale d’Arte in Lugano, Switzerland.
