= Council of Jewish Communities of Morocco =

Organization

- Formation: 1947
- Headquarters: Rabat, Morocco
- Secretary General: Serge Berdugo
- Website: mimouna.ma

The Council of Jewish Communities of Morocco (French: Conseil des Communautés Israélites du Maroc, abbreviated CCIM) is a central organization for Moroccan Jews established in 1947 during the French protectorate, in the context of the colonial government's post-World War II reforms attempting to quell the Jewish youth leadership's calls for democracy and self-expression.

== History ==
In 1918, the French colonial administration recognized local Jewish community councils. In 1931, they were given a legal personality.

The Dahir of 1918, which first organized the Jewish courts and established a legal organization for the Jewish communities in Morocco, was replaced the Dahir of 1945, which democratized the internal political process of the Jewish communities. It called for yearly meetings of the leaders of the country's Jewish communities to discuss their common issues, and the CCMI was the organ through which those discussions took place.

The French placed Jewish supporters loyal to them, such as Jacques Dahan, at the leadership of the council, mediating between the interests of the French government and the Jewish community. The organization published La Voix des communautés, a monthly newspaper representing the mainstream views of the Westernized class of Moroccan Jews.

In the 1950s, Samuel-Daniel Levy and the Council of Jewish Communities of Morocco established the Sanatorium Israélite Ben Ahmed, a sanatorium dedicated to Jewish patients with tuberculosis in Ben Ahmed.

The leadership of the council was replaced in 1956 with the end of the French protectorate. In 1961, with the coronation of Hassan II, David Amar assumed leadership of the council 1957-1974 and 1977 - 1987 . This period coincided with Operation Yachin, when the majority of Moroccan Jews migrated to Israel.

Under Serge Berdugo, and after the emigration of the majority of the Moroccan Jewish population, the CCIM assumed the responsibility of maintaining Jewish historical sites and holy places and of promoting Morocco's Jewish heritage. In July 2022, secretary-general of the CCIM Serge Berdugo expressed the recognition and pride in the measures reorganizing the Jewish community in Morocco taken by the royal cabinet of King Mohammed VI.
