= L'Union Marocaine =

Francophone Jewish newspaper

L’Union Marocaine was a francophone Jewish newspaper published in Casablanca 1932 to 1940. Its editorial line was opposed to Zionism and its editor was Elie Nataf, a leader of the Jewish community affiliated with the Alliance Israélite Universelle. It was established to speak for Yahia Zagury and other alliancistes, Jewish notables who supported the Alliance Israélite Universelle and opposed Zionism, and to counter the influence of the Zionist publication L’Avenir Illustré.
