= Marcia Hafif =

American painter

- Hafif in 1968 in Rome, photo by Tony Vaccaro
- Born: Marcia Jean Woods; August 15, 1929; Pomona, California
- Died: April 17, 2018 (aged 88)
- Education: Pomona College
- Occupation: Painter

Marcia Jean Hafif (née Woods; August 15, 1929 – April 17, 2018) was an American painter born in Pomona, California.

Her work has been associated with the Radical Painting Group, an artist collective focused on abstraction and active during the 1970s and 1980s, which she formed together with Joseph Marioni, Olivier Mosset, and Erik Saxon.

== Life and career ==
Hafif was born on August 15, 1929, in Pomona, California. After graduating from Pomona College in 1951, Hafif married and worked as a third-grade teacher. In the late 50s, she divorced her husband and began doing graduate work in Italian Renaissance and Far Eastern Art at Claremont Graduate School. In the summer of 1960, Hafif took a class with Richards Ruben, through whom she met Walter Hopps and various artists showing at Ferus Gallery in Los Angeles.

In 1961 Hafif traveled to Italy, planning to spend a year in Florence. Passing through Rome, Hafif was drawn to the atmosphere of the city, remaining there for almost eight years.

Returning to California in 1969, Hafif entered the first MFA class at the University of California, Irvine. She temporarily left painting to experiment in photography, film, sound, text, and installation. In 1970 Hafif began working on Notes on Bob and Nancy (1970-1977), an hour-long film featuring fellow UCI graduate students Nancy Buchanan and Robert Walker. Hafif's MFA thesis exhibition, U.C.I. Gallery, Irvine, CA 1971 (1971) featured 12 black and white photographs that depicted details of the gallery space in which they were displayed. This exhibition revealed an interest in "doing something that refers back to itself."

In 1971, Hafif moved to New York City to search out a return to painting at a time when the validity of painting was in doubt. She awoke on the morning of January 1, 1972, to make her first pencil on paper drawing. Starting in the upper left corner, Hafif covered the page across and down with short vertical marks. As she shifted back into painting, Hafif continued in this mode, methodically covering her canvases with short vertical marks of paint. Over the course of one year, Hafif developed a painting series that transitioned from white to black. An Extended Gray Scale (1972–73) came to encompass 106 oil paintings, each 22 x 22 inches. Each canvas was painted in a different tone of gray, determined by Hafif's ability to visually distinguish a difference in tone to the canvas preceding it.

Exhibiting for more than eight years with Sonnabend Gallery in Soho and Paris, she developed series of paintings that would become the basis of what came to be called The Inventory: 1974, Mass Tone Paintings; 1975, Wall Paintings; 1976, Pencil Drawings; 1978, Neutral Mix Paintings; 1979, Broken Color Paintings at The Clocktower with Alanna Heiss; 1981, Black Paintings. During this time she also published articles on painting in Artforum: “Beginning Again” in 1978, and in Art in America: “Getting on With Painting,” 1981, and “True Colors,” in 1989.

In the 1980s and 1990s, she developed new series, along with relationships with galleries in Europe, first in Munich, then Düsseldorf, and eventually Vienna, London, Paris, and elsewhere. Living part-time in California after 1999 still other series of paintings have appeared, most recently the Shade Paintings.

Hafif died on April 17, 2018, at the age of 88.

== Exhibitions ==
- 2021 - work was included in the exhibition Women in Abstraction at the Centre Pompidou.
- 2018
  - "Marcia Hafif: A Place Apart", Pomona College Museum of Art, September 4 - December 22, 2018
  - "Marcia Hafif: Films (1970–1999)", Städtische Galerie im Lenbachhaus und Kunstbau, Munich, July 17- September 30, 2018
- 2010 - "From the Inventory: Black Paintings, 1979-1980", Newman Popiashvili Gallery
- 2012 - "Marcia Hafif: From the Inventory – Late Roman Paintings", Larry Becker Contemporary Art, May 5 – July 7, 2012
- 2015 - "Marcia Hafif: From the Inventory", Laguna Art Museum, June 28 – September 27, 2015
- 1985 - "Marcia Hafif. Three Paintings", Rupert Walser Gallery Munich
- 1969 - "Marcia Hafif. New Paintings", Roma, Galleria Editalia Qui arte contemporanea.

== Collections ==
Hafif's work is held in collections worldwide including The Museum of Modern Art, New York.
