= Al Wifaq (organization) =

- Founded: February 1956; 70 years ago
- Location: Morocco
- Key people: Marc Sabbah, Joe Ohana, Albert Aflalo

Al-Wifāq (Arabic: الوفاق) was a Moroccan Jewish nationalist organization promoting coexistence between Jewish and Muslim communities in Morocco.

It was created January 1956, shortly before the end of the French protectorate, by members of Istiqlal Party and the Democratic Independence Party to foster nationalist sentiment among Moroccan Jews and to discourage them from emigrating to Israel. It was announced in the chamber of commerce of Casablanca, a center of Jewish activity, and soon opened chapters in other cities including Rabat, Meknes, Fes, and Asfi.

Part of its program was social, in the service of Jewish-Muslim coexistence and familiarizing Muslims with Jewish culture: galas attended by Jews and Muslims, broadcasting Jewish songs nationally on Moroccan Radio and Television, adding Hebrew to the language offerings at the Arabic Department of the university in Rabat, and hosting public lectures about Jewish history and culture throughout Morocco. Part of its program was also working to prepare the country's Jewish population for "the responsibilities of citizenship in independent Morocco," especially promoting literacy in Arabic among Jews.

These efforts had only limited success. For example, La Voix des communautés (“the Voice of the Communities”), a monthly Jewish periodical, was published with an Arabic supplement, but just once. Jews wrote for some Moroccan nationalist publications in Arabic, but no Muslims were published in any Jewish publications.

Marc Sabbah, close to the Istiqlal leader Mehdi Ben Barka, was among the Jewish leaders of al-Wifāq. Others included Joe Ohana and Albert Aflalo.

== See also ==
- History of the Jews in Morocco
- Mellah
