= L'Avenir Illustré =

Jewish periodical in Morocco (1926–1940)

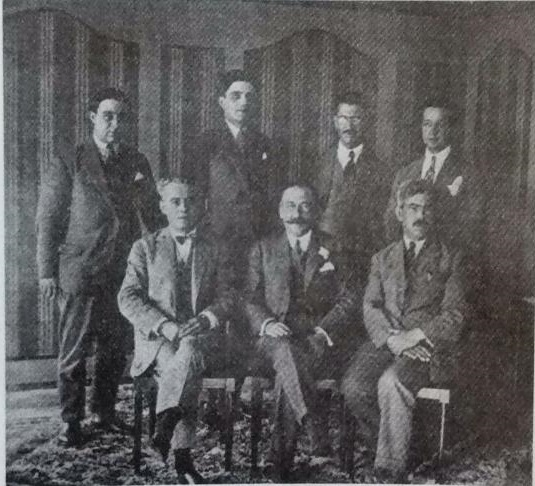
Members of the board of the Jewish-Moroccan newspaper L'Avenir Illustré, 1926

L’Avenir Illustré was a francophone Jewish periodical published in Casablanca, Morocco, from 1926 to 1940 that disseminated Zionist ideology and propaganda. Its targeted readership was primarily the Westernized urban Jewish elite in Morocco, especially francophone graduates of Alliance Israélite Universelle schools. The periodical was founded by Jonathan Thursz (1895–1976), an Ashkenazi Jew from Poland with British citizenship who studied in Belgium and settled in Morocco under the French protectorate.

In 1927, in observance of the 30th anniversary of the first World Zionist Congress in 1897 in Switzerland, the magazine celebrated the 'day of the shekel' and called on all Moroccan Jews to make a symbolic donation of 10 francs.

It was challenged in the Jewish community by L'Union Marocaine and, among Moroccan Nationalist Movement, by Mohamed El Kholti in L'Action du Peuple.
