= Jewish community of Fes =

Historical Moroccan community

The Jewish community of Fes was a community that existed in the city of Fes in Morocco for the last thousand years. Throughout the years, there were rabbis, poets and famous linguists in this community, who greatly influenced Jewish communities in Morocco and throughout the world.

== History ==
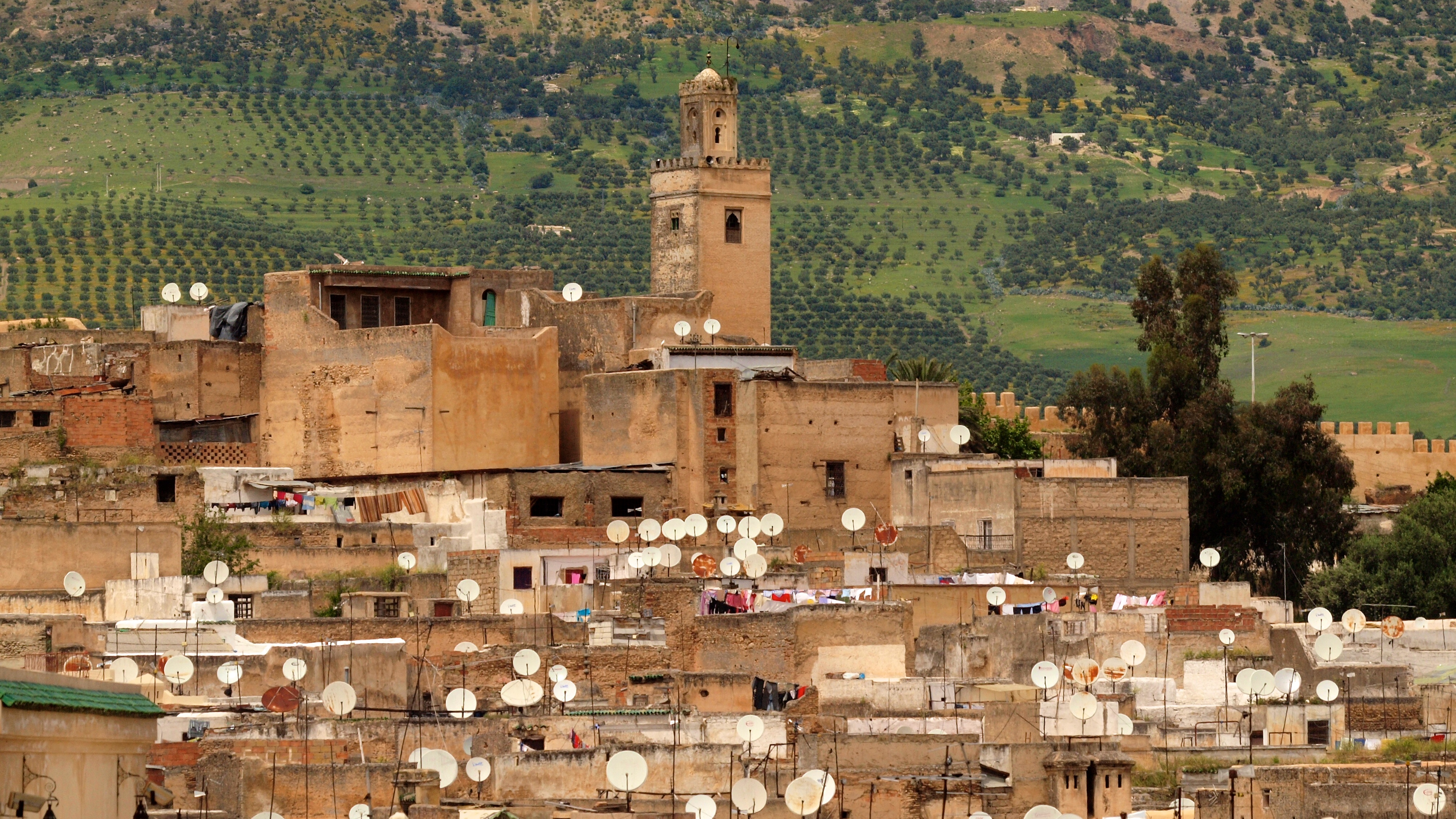
The area near Bab Guissa today, historically known as Funduq el-Yihoudi, was the original Jewish neighbourhood of Fes el-Bali. The original Jewish cemetery of the city was located outside the city gate (now occupied by later Muslim cemeteries).

Fez had long hosted the largest and one of the oldest Jewish communities in Morocco, present since the city's foundation by the Idrisids (in the late 8th or early 9th century). They lived in many parts of the city alongside the Muslim population, as evidenced by the fact that Jewish houses were purchased and demolished for the Almoravid expansion of the al-Qarawiyyin Mosque (located at the center of the city), and by the claims of Maimonides' residence in what later became the Dar al-Magana (in the western part of the city). Nonetheless, since the time of Idris II (early 9th century) the Jewish community was more or less concentrated in the neighbourhood known as Foundouk el-Yihoudi ("hotel/warehouse of the Jew") near Bab Guissa in the northeast of the city. The city's original Jewish cemetery was also located near here, just outside the gate of Bab Guissa.

As elsewhere in the Muslim world, the Jewish population lived under the protected but subordinate status of dhimmi, required to pay a jizya tax but able to move relatively freely and cultivate relations in other countries. Fez, along with Cordoba, was one of the centers of a Jewish intellectual and cultural renaissance taking place in the 10th and 11th centuries in Morocco and al-Andalus (Spain and Portugal under Muslim rule). A number of major figures such as Dunash Ben Labrat (poet, circa 920–990), Judah ben David Hayyuj (or Abu Zakariyya Yahya; grammarian, circa 945–1012), and the great Talmudist Isaac al-Fasi (1013-1103) were all born or spent time in Fez. Maimonides also lived in Fez from 1159 to 1165 after fleeing al-Andalus. This age of prosperity came to an end, however, with the advent of Almohad rule in Morocco and Al-Andalus. The Almohads, who officially followed the radical reformist ideology of Ibn Tumart, abolished the jizya and the status of dhimmi, enforcing repressive measures against non-Muslims and other reforms. Jews under their rule were widely forced to convert or be exiled, with some converting but continuing to practice their Jewish faith in secret.

The decline of the Almohads and the rise of the Marinid dynasty's rule over Morocco in the 13th century brought a more tolerant climate in which the Jewish community was able to recover and grow again. Following the pogroms of 1391 under Spanish rule, in places like Seville and Catalonia, a large number of Spanish Jews (also referred to as Megorashim) fled to North Africa and settled in cities like Fez.

=== Construction of The Mellah ===
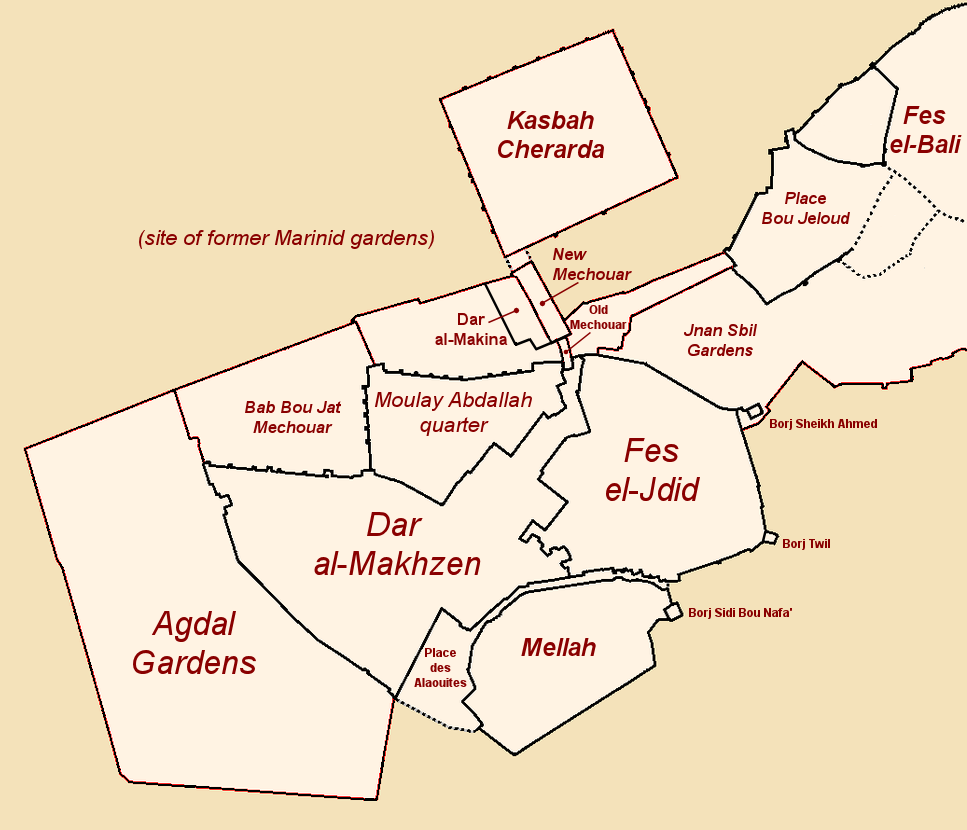
Layout of Fes el-Jdid, the Marinid royal city founded in 1276, showing the Mellah to the south

In 1276 the Marinids had founded Fes el-Jdid, a new fortified administrative city to house their royal palace and army barracks, located to the west of Fes el-Bali ("Old Fez"). Later in the Marinid period the Jewish inhabitants of Fes el-Bali were all moved to a new district in the southern part of Fes el-Jdid. This district, possibly created after the 1276 foundation, was located between the inner and outer southern walls of the city and was initially inhabited by Muslim garrisons, notably by the Sultan's mercenary contingents of Syrian archers. These regiments were disbanded around 1325 under Sultan Abu Sa'id. The district was first known as Hims, but also by the name Mellah (Arabic: ملاح, lit. 'salt' or 'saline area') due to either a saline water source in the area or to the former presence of a salt warehouse. This second name was later retained as the name of the Jewish quarter. This was the first "mellah" in Morocco; a name and phenomenon that came to be replicated in many other cities such as Marrakech. (A notable exception being the nearby town of Sefrou.)

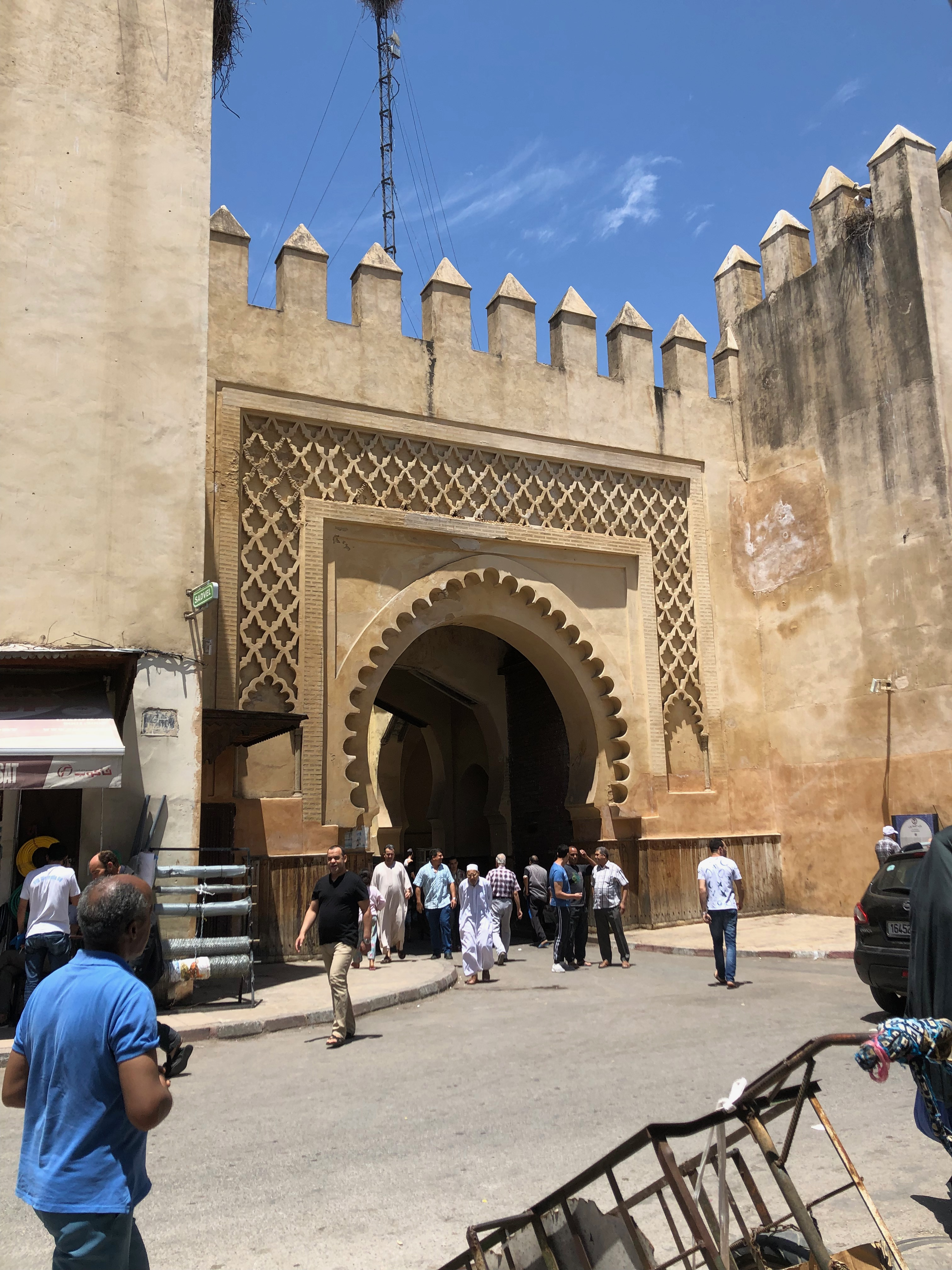
Bab Semmarine, the main southern gate of Fes el-Jdid

Both the exact reasons and the exact date for the creation of the Jewish Mellah of Fez are not firmly established. Historical accounts confirm that in the mid-14th century the Jews of Fez were still living in Fes el-Bali but that by the end of the 16th century they were well-established in the Mellah of Fes el-Jdid. Moroccan scholar Hicham Rguig, for example, states that the transfer is not precisely dated and argues that it likely happened in stages across the Marinid period (late 13th to 15th centuries), particularly following episodes of violence or repression against Jews in the old city. One of the earliest such instances of violence was a revolt in 1276 against the new Marinid dynasty, right before Sultan Abu Yusuf Ya'qub decided to found Fes el-Jdid. The revolt shook the whole city but also resulted in much violence against the Jewish inhabitants, which may have incited Abu Yusuf Ya'qub to intervene in some way to protect the community. Susan Gilson Miller, a scholar of Moroccan and Jewish history, has also noted that the urban fabric of the Mellah appears to have developed progressively and it's thus possible that a small Jewish population settled here right after the foundation of Fes el-Jdid and that other Jews fleeing the old city joined them later. Many authors, citing historical Jewish chronicles, attribute the main transfer more specifically to the "rediscovery" of Idris II's body in his old mosque at the center of the city in 1437. The area around the mosque, located in the middle of the city's main commercial districts, was turned into a ḥurm (حُرم 'sanctuary') where non-Muslims were not allowed to enter, resulting in the expulsion of the Jewish inhabitants and merchants there. At least several authors claim that the expulsion was further enforced to all of Fes el-Bali because it was given the status of a "holy" city as a result of the discovery. Other scholars also date the move generally to the mid-15th century, without arguing for a specific date. In any case, the transfer (whether progressive or sudden) occurred with some violence and hardship.

Broader political motivations for moving the Jewish community to Fes el-Jdid, closer to the royal palace, may have included the rulers' desire to take more direct advantage (or control) of their artisan skills and of their commercial relations with Jewish communities in Europe and other countries (which could be used for diplomatic purposes). The Mellah's Jewish cemetery was established at its southwestern edge (around what is now Place des Alaouites near the Royal Palace gates) on land which was donated to the Jewish community by a Marinid princess named Lalla Mina in the 15th century.

==== 1465 assault on the Mellah ====
The 15th century was also a time of political instability, with the Wattasid viziers taking over effective control from the Marinid dynasty and competing with other local factions in Fez. In 1465, the Mellah was attacked by the Muslim population of Fes el-Bali during a revolt led by the shurafa (noble sharifian families) against the Marinid sultan Abd al-Haqq II and his Jewish vizier Harun ibn Battash. The attack resulted in thousands of Jewish inhabitants being killed, with many others having to openly renounce their faith. The community took at least a decade to recover from this, growing again under the rule of the Wattasid Sultan Muhammad al-Shaykh (1472-1505).

==== Bildī converts ====
Although numerous Fessi Jews converted to Islam throughout the premodern period, the conversions spiked in the mid-fifteenth century. Many Jewish households—including powerful merchant families, such as the Bannānī, Ibn Shaqrūn, Bannīs, Barrāda, and Gassūs families—chose to convert (at least officially) rather than leave their homes and their businesses in the heart of the old city. These new Muslims, often retaining Jewish surnames, were referred to as Bildiyīn (Note: The term Bildiyīn has also been used to refer to Toshavim, or autochthonous Amazigh and Arabized Jews, as opposed to Megorashim, or Sephardic immigrants from Iberia.) (بلديين 'locals' or 'natives') as they did not have a traditional Arabic nisba, a surname indicating lineage or tribal affiliation, though some were given al-Islāmī (الإسلامي 'of Islam' or 'of conversion [to Islam]') as a nisba.

In the 16th century, tensions between Converts from judaism to Islam and older Muslims in Fes flared due to marketplace competition in the Qaysariya. The recent converts, unlike the Conversos in contemporary Iberia, were not accused of crypto-Judaism or disloyalty to Islam, though they did face discrimination. Under pressure from the shurafā, or Arab-Muslim nobles claiming Muhammadan lineage, Sultan Aḥmad al-Waṭṭāsī asked the city's Muslim jurists about the permissibility of discrimination among Muslims on the basis of origin. Seventeen of the jurists declared it illegal; merchants could be expelled from the Qaysariya for malpractice or dishonesty, but a Muslim could not be discriminated against based on origins or lineage.

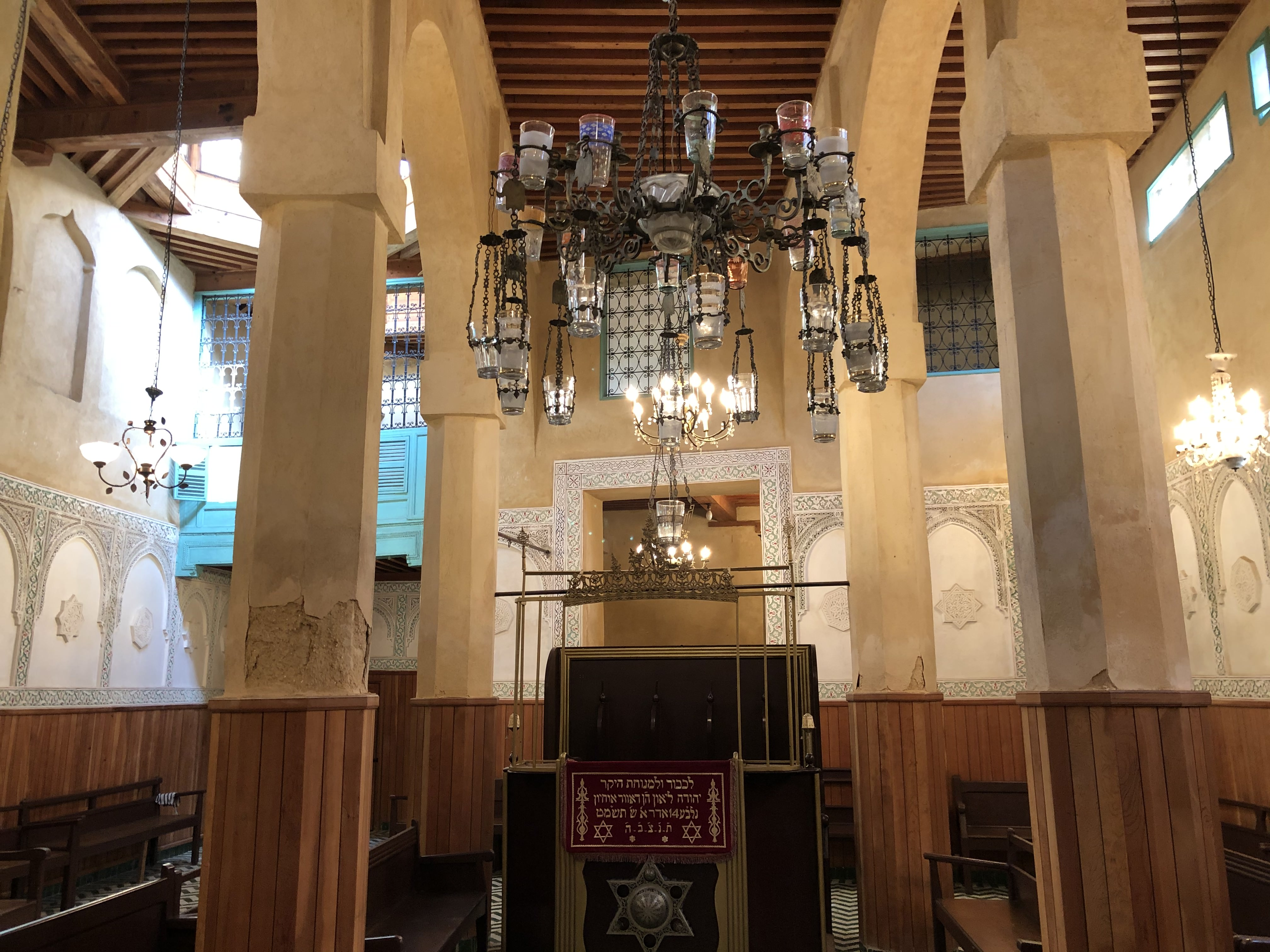
The Al Fassiyine Synagogue was one of the few synagogues where the non-Sephardic rituals of the toshavim (indigenous Moroccan Jews) continued up until the 20th century.

=== Arrival of Megorashim from Spain ===
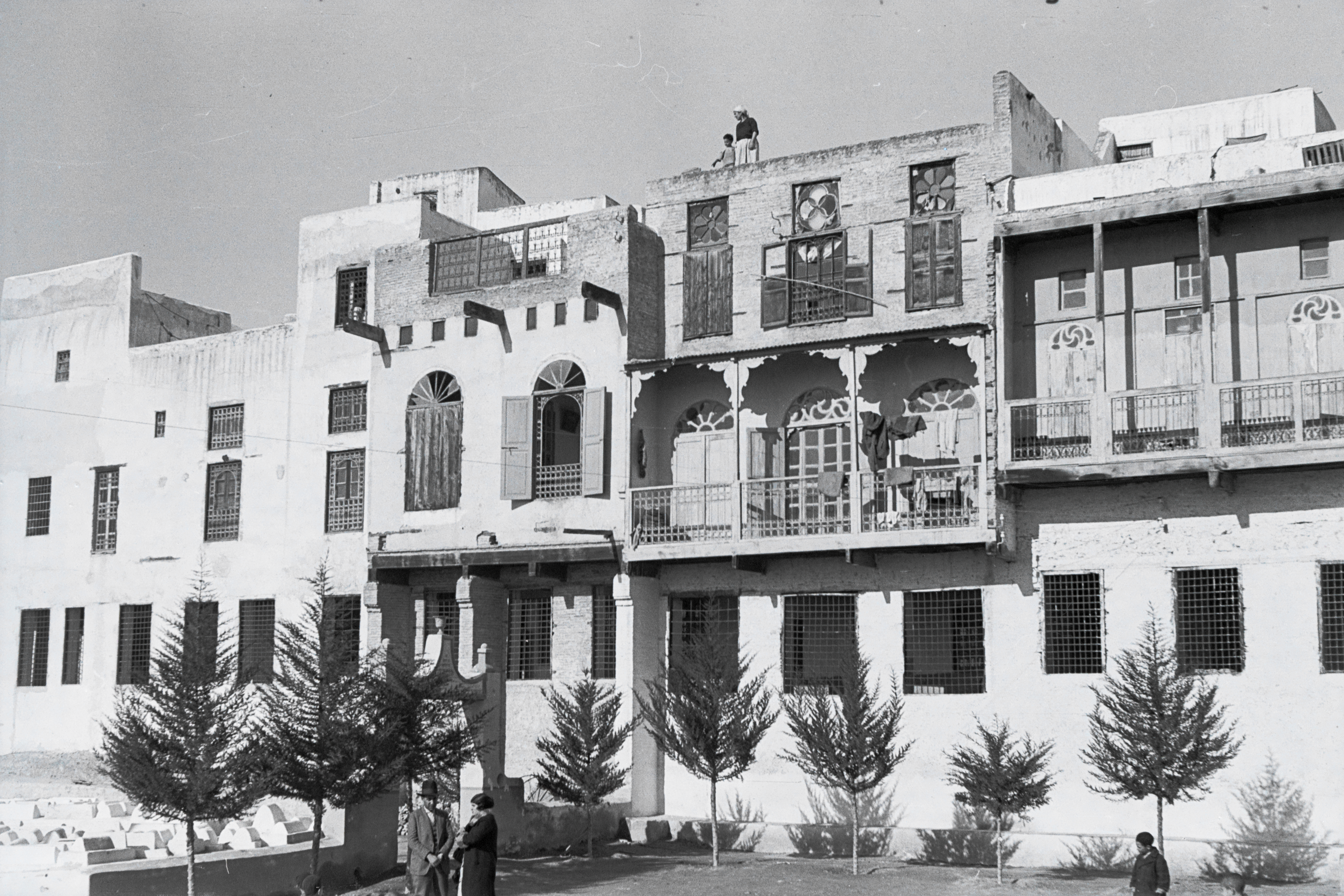
Jewish houses in the Mellah (photographed in 1932 on the edge of the cemetery)

In subsequent centuries the fortunes of the Mellah and the Jewish community of Fez varied according to circumstances, including general circumstances that affected all inhabitants of Fez such as famine or war. The Mellah's location inside the more heavily fortified Fes el-Jdid and close to the Royal Palace made it relatively secure, but the Jewish community nonetheless suffered disasters at various periods.

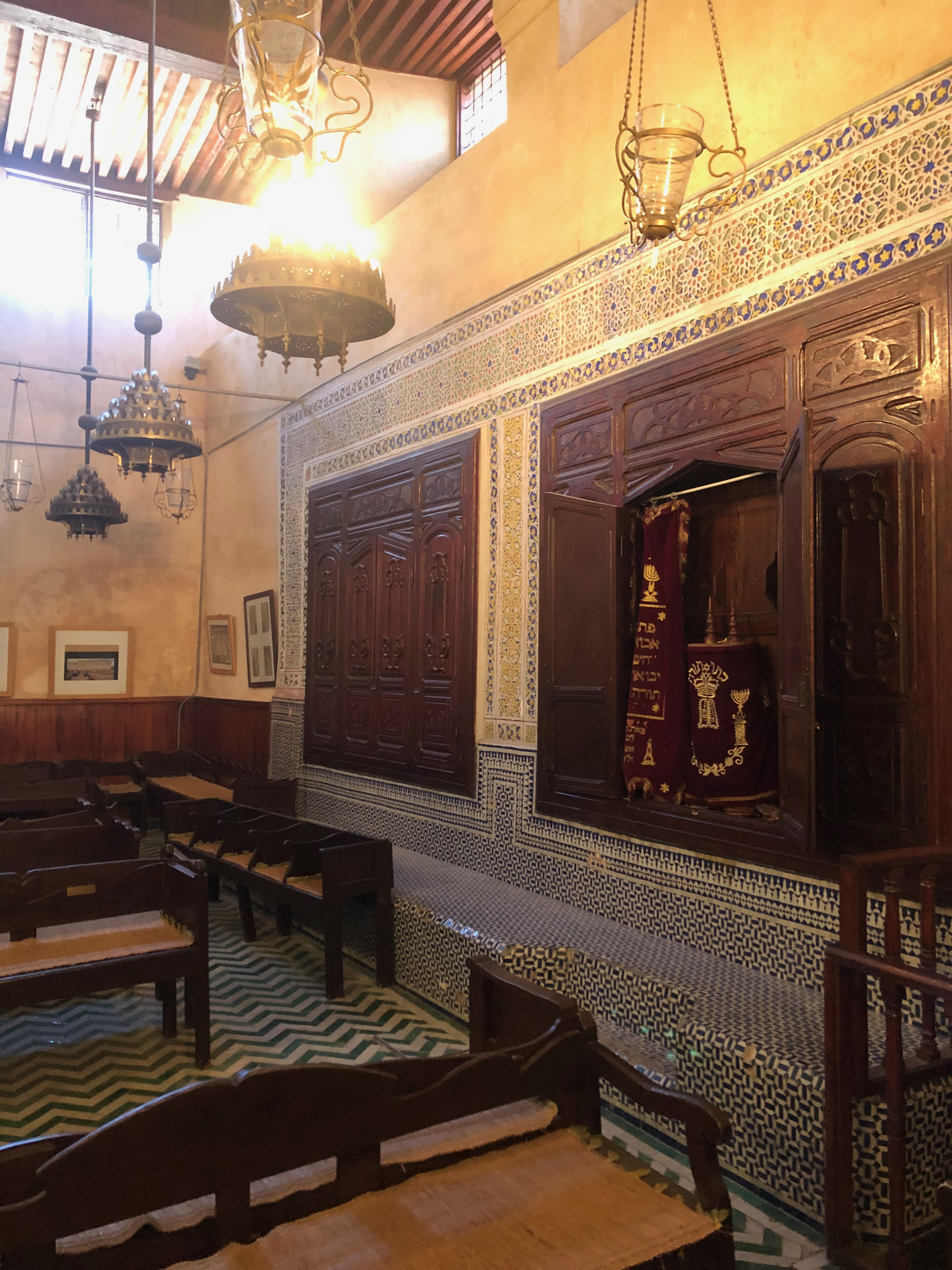
Interior of the Ibn Danan Synagogue, established in the 17th century

Major changes to the community occurred when in 1492 the Spanish crown expelled all Jews from Spain, with Portugal doing the same in 1497. The following waves of Spanish Jews migrating to Fez and North Africa increased the Jewish population and also altered its social, ethnic, and linguistic makeup.

According to a Belgian scholar who visited the Mellah in the mid-16th century, the Jewish quarter had an estimated population of 4000 at this time. The influx of migrants also revitalized Jewish cultural activity in the following years, while splitting the community along ethnic lines for many generations. The Megorashim of Spanish origin retained their heritage and their Spanish language while the indigenous Moroccan Toshavim, who spoke Arabic and were of Arab and Berber heritage, followed their own traditions. Members of the two communities worshiped in separate synagogues and were even buried separately.

The Toshavim and Megorashim had different religious practices and views. There were differences with regard to shehita, or ritual kosher slaughter, and to ketuba, or the marriage contract, obstructing their ability to eat together and marry, and therefore to assimilate. In the 16th century, a group of rabbis known as the "Sages from Castille" (Ladino: Hajamei Castilla) gained dominance in the interpretation of rabbinical law, but cultural and linguistic differences persisted. It was only in the 18th century that the two communities eventually blended together, with Arabic eventually becoming the main language of the entire community while the Spanish (Sephardic) minhag became dominant in religious practice.

=== Under the Zawiya Dila'iya (1641–1662) ===
Under Mohammed al-Hajj, the Zawiya Dila'iya governed Fez from 1641. This time was particularly difficult for the Jewish community of Fes, who through institutions such as Tujjar as-Sultan, had important ties with the Sharifi Saadi Makhzen. A Jewish chronicle of the time refers to Mohammed al-Hajj as the "sodomite of the zawiya" and recounts that in 1646 synagogues were ordered to close and were subsequently desecrated, damaged, or destroyed. The city beyond the mellah was not receptive to the Dila either, and for a brief period in 1651 they rebelled and invited Muhammad ibn Muhammad al-Sharif, one of the early Alawite Sultans, to take control of the city.

=== Under ʿAlawī rule (1666–present) ===
The community continued to thrive or suffer depending on conditions. In the 17th century a significant influx of Jews from the Tadla region and from the Sous Valley arrived under the reigns of the ʿAlawī sultans Moulay Rashid and Moulay Isma'il, respectively. By contrast, serious hardship took place in 1790 to 1792 during a period of general turmoil and decline under Sultan Moulay Yazid. During these two years the sultan forced the entire Jewish community to move next to the outlying Kasbah Cherarda on the other side of Fes el-Jdid. The Mellah was occupied by tribal troops allied to him, its synagogue was replaced by a mosque, and the Jewish cemetery and its contents were moved to a cemetery near Bab Guissa. Moreover, Moulay Yazid permanently reduced the size of the district by demolishing the old city walls around it and rebuilding them along a much smaller perimeter. It was only after the sultan's death that the chief Muslim qadi (judge) of Fez ordered the Mellah to be restored to the Jewish community, along with the demolition of the mosque built by Yazid's troops.

The fortunes of the Jewish community improved considerably in the 19th century when the expansion of contact and trade with Europe allowed the Jewish merchant class to place themselves at the center of international trade networks in Morocco. This also led to a greater social openness and a shift in tastes and attitudes, especially among richer Jews, who built luxurious residences in the upper Mellah.

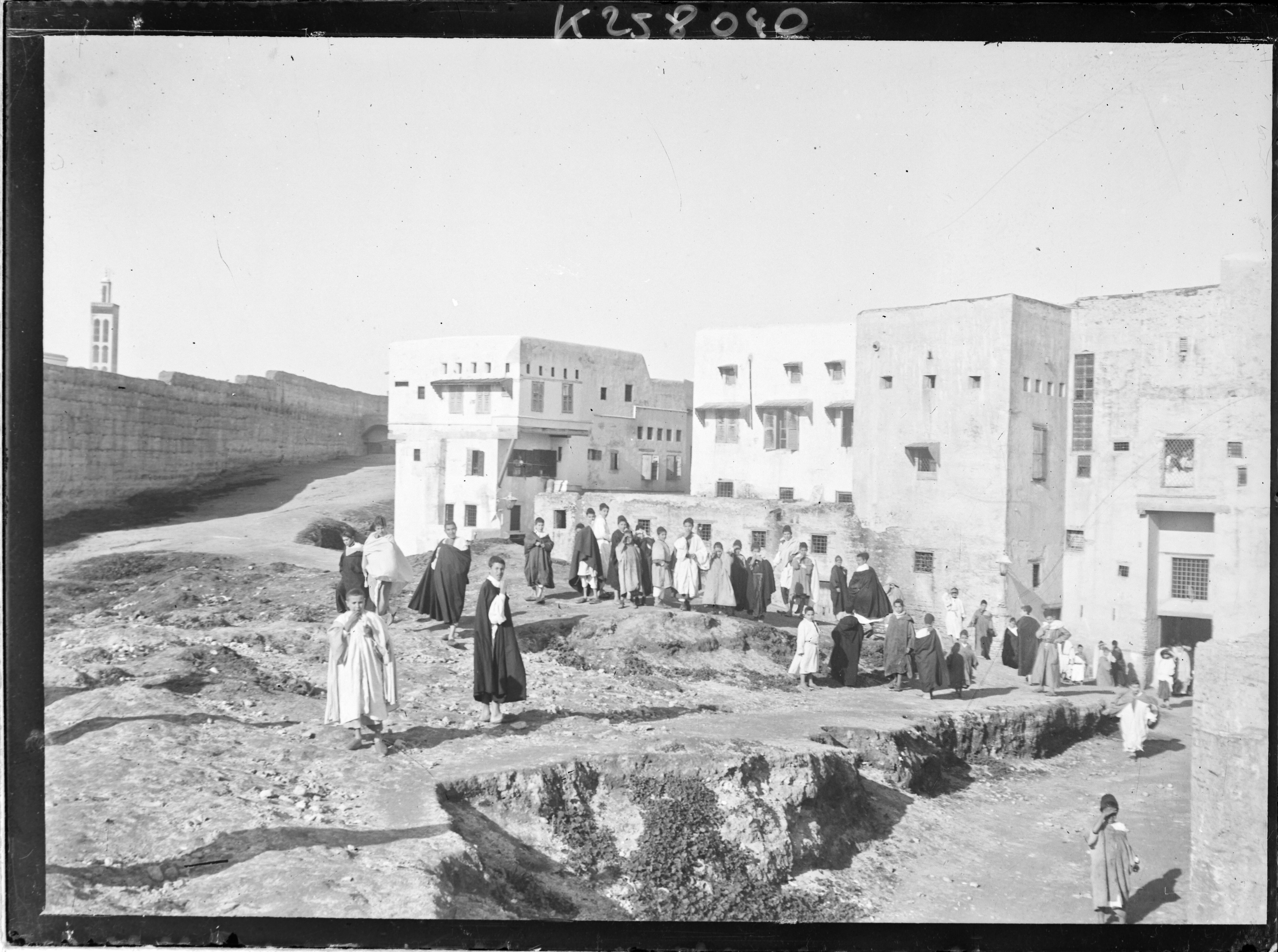
Young Jewish students of the French school, 1905.

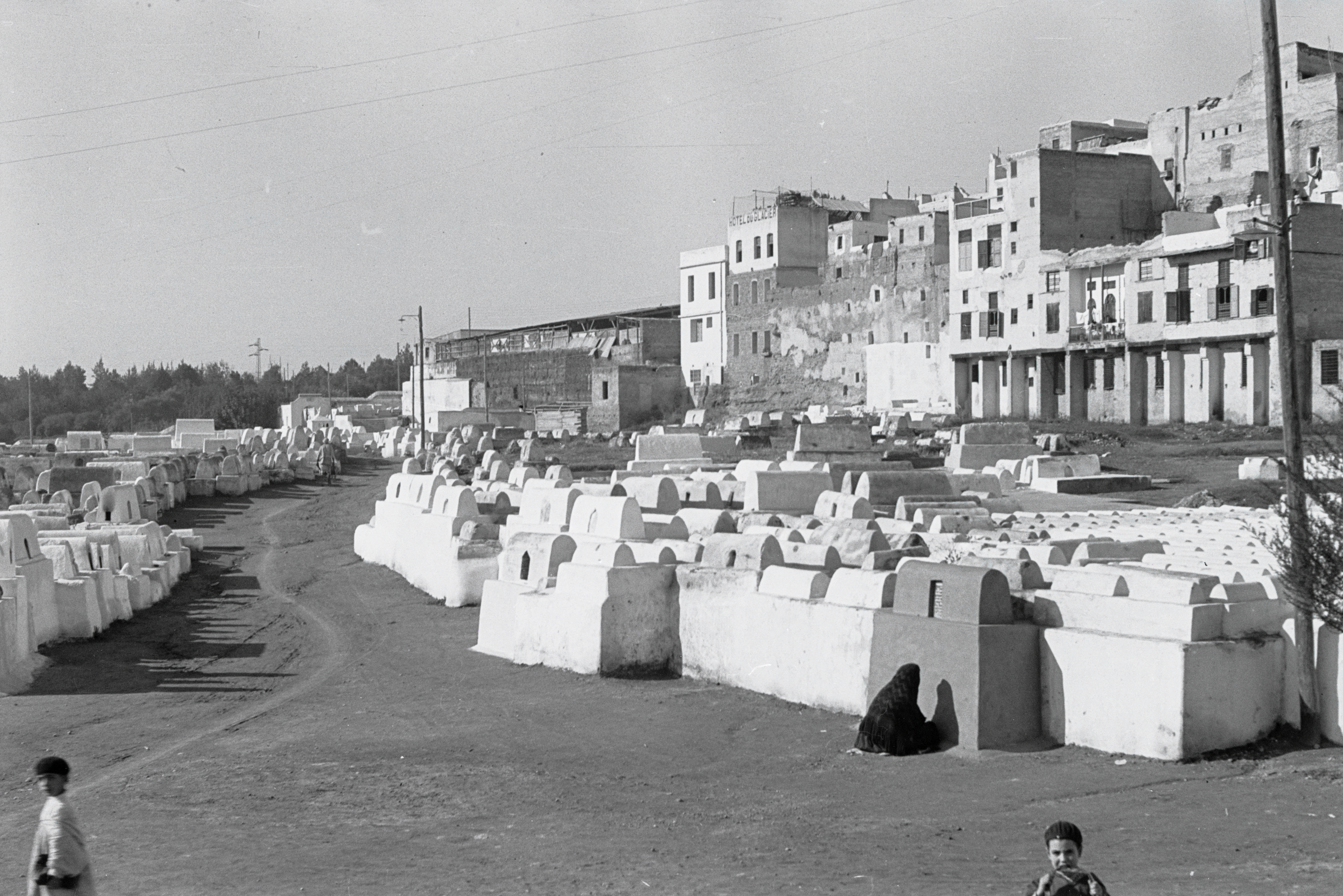
The Jewish Cemetery in 1932

By the end of the 19th century the district had some 15 synagogues. In 1894, the Sultan ordered the old Jewish Cemetery, located at the base of the Royal Palace's outer wall, to be moved in order to accommodate an expansion of the palace. As a result, the cemetery and its contents were moved to a new location at the southeastern corner of the Mellah, where it is still found today. However, other authors attribute this displacement of the cemetery to the French administration's works in the area in 1912, noting that tombs were still present in the old cemetery up until 1912. The current cemetery to the southeast had probably existed from the early 19th century but was still largely empty in its eastern parts before the 20th century.

=== 20th century and present day ===
In 1905, a group of Sephardic Jews of Fes sent a letter in vernacular Moroccan Arabic (Darija) written in Hebrew letters to Alfonso XIII, King of Spain, asking him to establish a Spanish school in the mellah of Fes and to protect their community, which they described as descendants of Spain and therefore his subjects.

==== Zionism in Fes ====
Zionism spread slowly in Morocco and in the Jewish community of Fes. The first Zionist association in Fes, the Hibbat-Zion Society, was established in 1908, after others some years before in the coastal cities of Tetuan, Essaouira, and Asfi. The following year, it expanded to Meknes and Sefrou. Because the Zionist Organization would not be able to sponsor the association, it sought the support of the Alliance Israélite Universelle. The movement drew the attention of Westernized elites, affluent merchants, and some influential rabbis in the beginning, but it did not have widespread popularity. After the Balfour Declaration in 1917, there was an increase in Zionist activity and propaganda in Morocco. A man named Joseph Levy of the Maccabean Land Company of London went to Fes to distribute Zionist literature and sell land in Palestine to some Fessi Jews.

==== Colonial period ====
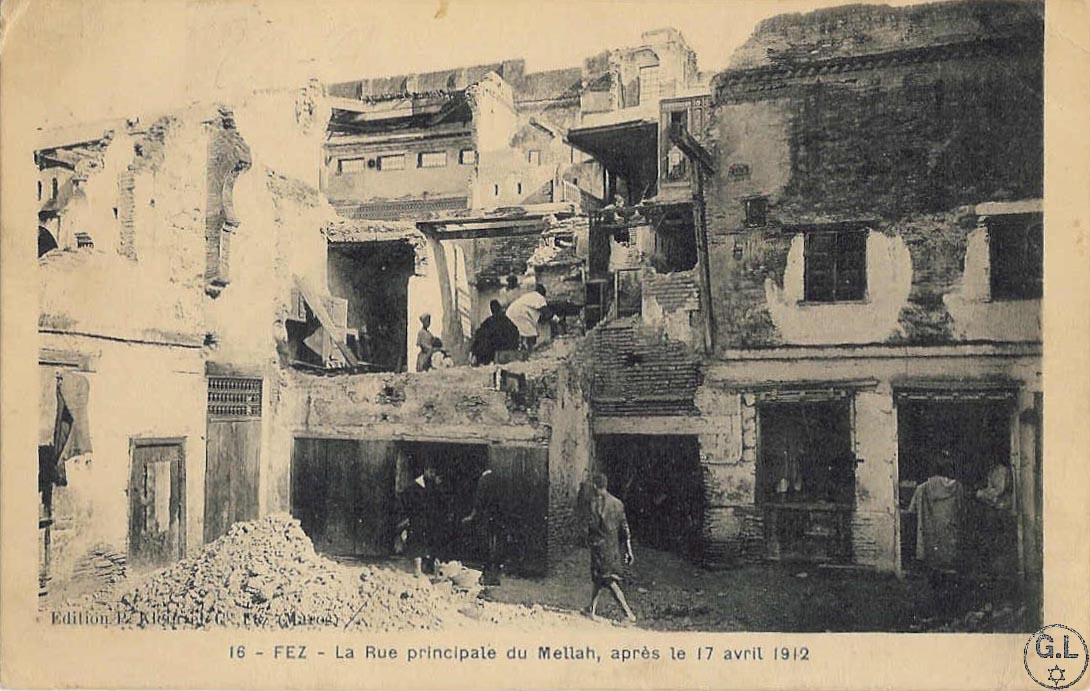
Houses in the Mellah destroyed by French artillery fire in the 1912 riots

In 1912 French colonial rule was instituted over Morocco following the Treaty of Fes. One immediate consequence was the 1912 riots in Fez, a popular uprising which included deadly attacks targeting Europeans as well as native Jewish inhabitants in the Mellah (perceived as being too close to the new administration), followed by an even deadlier repression against the general population. Fez and its Royal Palace ceased to be the center of power in Morocco as the capital was moved to Rabat. A number of social and physical changes took place at this period and across the 20th century. Starting under Lyautey, the creation of the French Ville Nouvelle ("New City") to the west also had a wider impact on the entire city's development.

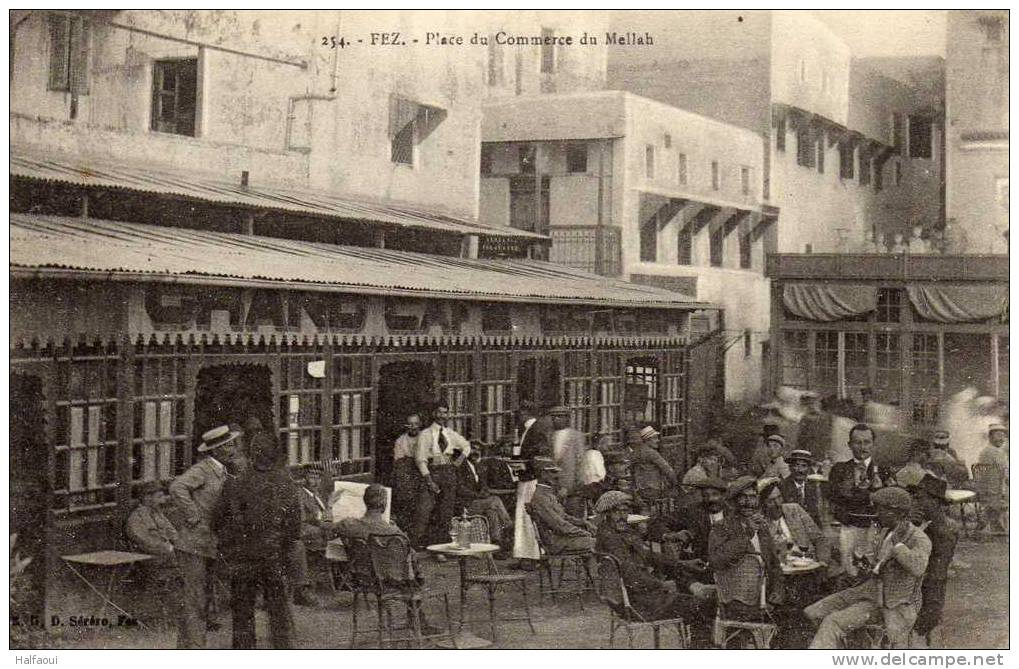
Place du Commerce, created by the French in 1912 behind Bab al-Amer

In the area around the Bab al-Amer gate, on the southwestern edge of the Mellah, the French administration judged the old gate too narrow and inconvenient for traffic and demolished a nearby aqueduct and some of the surrounding wall in order to improve access. In the process they created a large open square on the site of the earlier Jewish cemetery which became known as Place du Commerce, now also adjoined by the larger Place des Alaouites. In 1924, the French went further and demolished a series of modest shops and stables on the northern edge of the Jewish Mellah in order to build a wide road for vehicles (Rue Boukhessissat or Bou Khsisat; later also Rue des Mérinides) between the Mellah and the southern wall of the Royal Palace. The former shops were replaced with more ostentatious boutiques built in the architectural style of the Jewish houses of the Mellah, with many open balconies and outward ornamentation.

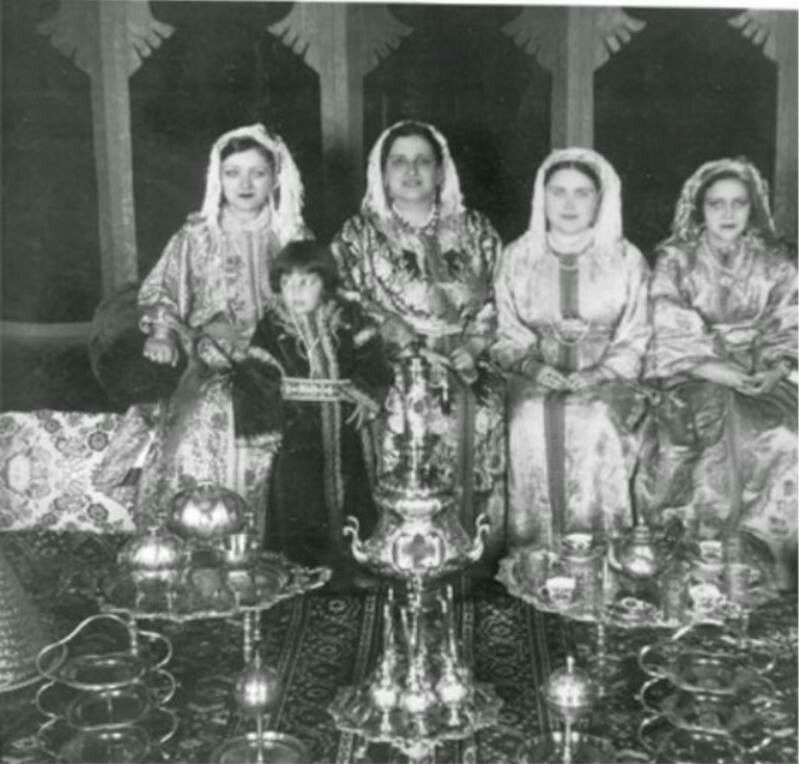
Jewish women seated and dressed in traditional caftan during a wedding ceremony in Fes. C. 1930

While the population of Fez and Fes el-Jdid increased over this period, in the second half of the 20th century the Mellah became steadily depopulated of its Jewish inhabitants who either moved to the Ville Nouvelle, to Casablanca, or emigrated to countries like France, Canada, and Israel. In the late 1940s, estimates of the Jewish population include 15,150 in the Mellah and 22,000 in all of Fez. Major waves of emigration after this depleted the Jewish population. The district was progressively taken over instead by other Muslim residents, who make up its population today. In 1997 there were reportedly only 150 Jews in all of Fez and no functioning synagogues remained in the Mellah.

== Culture ==
=== Language ===
The Jewish community of Fes, prior to the departure of most of the city's Jewish residents in the second half of the 20th century, spoke Arabic in a Fessi dialect similar to Muslim inhabitants of city. (Note: There are competing theories about the historical roots of Moroccan Jewish dialects of Arabic. Some scholars argue that they were strongly influenced by Andalusi Arabic dialects (which were similar to North African dialects) brought by Jewish refugees from Spain after 1492, while other scholars argue that these same refugees mostly spoke Judeo-Spanish when they arrived and eventually adopted existing Arabic dialects in the cities.)

=== Mellah ===
The Mellah was home to Bildiyīn (Moroccan Arabic: بلديين, lit. 'of the country, natives'), also known as Toshavim (Hebrew: תושבים, "residents"), as well as Rūmiyīn (Moroccan Arabic: روميين, lit. 'Romans, Europeans, foreigners'), or Megorashim (Hebrew: מגורשים 'expelled'), Sephardic Jewish refugees from Iberia who were expelled from Spain.

=== Society ===
The Jewish community of Fes had various communal institutions: the synagogue, the beth din, the cemeteries, as well as charitable and educational institutions. Before the establishment of the French protectorate in Morocco, the Jewish community of Fes had a Shaykh al-Yahud (شيخ اليهود 'sheikh of the Jews', known in Hebrew as the nagid נגיד), a Jewish community leader who would act as a liaison between Jewish community and Muslim authorities. Among the functionaries of the Jewish community of Fes there were also the respector, the communal council, the rabbis, the judges (dayyanim), and the scribes (sofrim). Fessi Jews were also employed in the metals industry, textiles, leathercrafts, and other crafts and services. Fessi Jews were also active in local and international commerce, with the city's Sephardic population especially involved in trade with Iberia.

== Notable families ==
Rabbis of Fes in 1963. In the center of the image, Yedidyah Monsonego

Especially from the 15th century on, rabbis from venerated families interpreted the halakha, or Jewish rabbinical law, for the community in Fes. Among the notable families that flourished in Fes were:

- Ibn Danan, Sephardic family hailing from Granada
- Ibn Nāʾīm, flourished in Fes and Algiers, 18th–20th c.
- Ibn Ṣūr
- Ibn ʿAṭṭār, flourished in Fes and Salé, 17th–18th c.
- Uzziel
- Sarfati
- Monsonego, Sephardic family that settled in Fes after 1492 expulsion, probably from Monzón
