= L'Action du Peuple =

Newspaper in Morocco

L'Action du Peuple عمل الشعب
- Founder: Muhammad Bin al-Hassan al-Wazzani
- Editor: Muhammad Bin al-Hassan al-Wazzani
- Founded: August 4, 1933; 92 years ago

L'Action du Peuple (Arabic: عمل الشعب, The Work of the People) was the first francophone newspaper published by the Moroccan Nationalist Movement in the area under the control of the French Protectorate in Morocco. As the French authorities would not allow a nationalist publication in Arabic, it was published in French. Its founder and editor was Muhammad Ibn al-Hassan al-Wazzaani. Its first issue was published in Fes on August 4, 1933, four months before the first Throne Day, which the newspaper promoted. It was edited by Khadija Diouri, wife of the nationalist leader Mohamed Diouri.

== History ==
Muhammad Ibn al-Hassan al-Wazzaani proposed the idea of publishing this newspaper to members of az-Zawiya (الزاوية, from zawiya), the leadership of the Covert Nationalist Organization (التنظيم الوطني السري). Most members—particularly those who were associated with al-Qarawiyiin University and whom the aristocrats that funded the Moroccan Nationalist Movement held in high esteem—disagreed with the idea, objecting to the use of the French language. They believed it was necessary to speak to the people in their own language to inform them and mobilize them around the nationalist cause.

Only a minority led by al-Wazzaani, who had studied in French, supported the use of the colonists' language to address the colonial apparatus in its own language, and influence French popular opinion, both in Morocco and in France. These were inspired by the experience of Maghreb (1932-1936), a publication associated with Robert-Jean Longuet and the SFIO that gave the Moroccan Nationalist Movement a voice in Paris. al-Wazzaani also had experience helping Shakib Arslan with the publication of La Nation Arabe, a francophone Pan-Islamist, Pan-Arabist newspaper published in Geneva.

The newspaper l'Action du Peuple was banned by the French colonial authorities only months after its first publication. December 1933, al-Wazzaani replaced it temporarily with an alternative called Volonté du Peuple, which published 14 issues. When the court of appeals allowed the return of l'Action du Peuple, al-Wazzaani brought it back.

Among the journalists published in l'Action du Peuple were Ahmed Sefrioui and Omar Bin Abd al-Jaliil, the latter of whom covered the abuses of colonial agriculture.
