= Maccabaeans =

British Jewish charity

Order of Ancient Maccabeans (also Maccabaeans) is an Anglo-Jewish society. The order is a friendly society established in 1891, and registered on 8 May 1901, under the Friendly Societies' Act, as amended 1896.

== History ==
The Maccabaeans were founded in 1891 by Ephraim Ish-Kishor and named after the Maccabees. The order was founded with the goal of cooperation between members and an interest in Judaism. Many members were also part of the "Lovers of Zion". As is usual for friendly societies, its members had to pay a fee of one shekel and received social and medical support. In addition to that, Jewish and "non-Jewish honorary members" alike had to profess support for the Zionist movement. The funds were used to support the settling of Jews to Palestine with a "Maccabean Land Company" being founded in 1911 to help shareholders purchase land in modern-day Israel.

After a visit by Theodor Herzl in 1896, Herbert Bentwich organized a trip to Palestine which he called the "Maccabaean Pilgrimage". Herzl declined an invitation to the pilgrimage but supported it. According to Maja Gildin Zuckerman, a scholar of modern Jewish cultural history, this was a turning point after which the Maccabaeans' Zionism took a political form rather than religious.

=== Maccabean Land Company ===
After the Balfour Declaration in 1917, the Maccabean Land Company was involved in the sale of plots of land in Palestine to Jews in Morocco. Joseph H. Levy of the Maccabean Land Company of London went to Fes to distribute Zionist literature and sell land in Palestine to some Fessi Jews. Through the Maccabean Land Company, too, Rabbi Pinhas Khalifa Ha-Cohen Azogh, leading a Zionist office in Marrakesh, sold 36 plots of land in Palestine to Moroccan Jews, who were told years later when they attempted to move and settle there that the land had been reserved for Eastern European Jews to settle.

== Past presidents ==
- 1891–1903 Raphael Meldola (in whose honour the society awards the Meldola medal for Chemistry)
- 1903–04 Albert Goldsmid
- 1904–27 Solomon Joseph Solomon
- 1927–32 Herbert Bentwich
- 1932–54 Selig Brodetsky
- 1982–90 Sir Alan Marre
- 1990–2000 Sir John Balcombe
- 2000–present Sir Ian Gainsford

Other notable members have included:

- Louis Barnett Abrahams
- Chief Rabbi Hermann Adler
- Norman Bentwich
- Sir Ernst Boris Chain
- Marcus Hartog
- Rev. Morris Joseph
- Chief Rabbi Joseph H. Hertz
- Waldemar Haffkine
- Sir Ian Heilbron
- Sir Bernard Rix
- Charles Kensington Salaman
- Isaac Snowman
- Rev. Joseph Stern
- Rev. Charles Voysey (Not Jewish; hon. member)
- Chaim Weizmann
- Lucien Wolf
- Israel Zangwill
