= Jewish exodus from the Muslim world =

20th-century events

Approximately 900,000 Jews migrated, fled, or were expelled from Muslim-majority countries throughout Africa and Asia in the 20th century, primarily after the establishment of the State of Israel. Large-scale migrations were also organized, sponsored, and facilitated by Zionist organizations such as Mossad LeAliyah Bet, the Jewish Agency, and the Hebrew Immigrant Aid Society. The mass movement mainly transpired from 1948 to the early 1970s, with one final exodus of Iranian Jews occurring shortly after the Islamic Revolution in 1979–1980. An estimated 650,000 (72%) of these Jews resettled in Israel.

A number of small-scale Jewish migrations began across the Middle East in the early 20th century, with the only substantial aliyot (Jewish immigrations to the Land of Israel) coming from Yemen and Syria. Few Jews from Muslim countries immigrated during the British Mandate for Palestine. Prior to Israel's independence in 1948, approximately 800,000 Jews were living on lands that now make up the Arab world. Of these, just under two-thirds lived in the French- and Italian-controlled regions of North Africa, 15–20% lived in the Kingdom of Iraq, approximately 10% lived in the Kingdom of Egypt, and approximately 7% lived in the Aden Colony, Aden Protectorate and the Kingdom of Yemen. A further 200,000 Jews lived in the Imperial State of Iran and the Republic of Turkey. The first large-scale exoduses took place in the late 1940s and early 1950s, primarily from Iraq, Yemen, and Libya. In these cases, over 90% of the Jewish population left, leaving their assets and properties behind. Between 1948 and 1951, 250,000 Jews immigrated to Israel from Arab countries. In response, the Israeli government implemented policies to accommodate 600,000 immigrants over four years, doubling the country's Jewish population. Reactions in the Knesset were mixed; in addition to some Israeli officials, there were those within the Jewish Agency who opposed promoting a large-scale emigration movement among Jews whose lives were not in immediate danger.

Later waves peaked at different times in different regions over the subsequent decades. The exodus from Egypt peaked in 1956, following the Suez Crisis; emigrations from other North African countries peaked in the 1960s. Lebanon's Jewish population temporarily increased due to an influx of Jews from other Arab countries, before it dwindled by the mid-1970s. 600,000 Jews from Arab and Muslim countries had relocated to Israel by 1972, while another 300,000 migrated to France, the United States and Canada. Today, the descendants of Jews who immigrated to Israel from other Middle Eastern lands (known as Mizrahi Jews and Sephardic Jews) constitute more than half of all Israelis. The Jewish Agency for Israel estimated that the total number of Jews in Arab and Muslim countries in 2023 was 27,000, with Turkey having 14,200 Jewish residents and Iran having 9,100.

The reasons for the exoduses include: pull factors such as the desire to fulfill Zionism, better economic prospects and security, and the Jewish Agency for Palestine's 1944 "One Million Plan" to encourage and accommodate Jewish immigrants from Arab- and Muslim-majority countries; and push factors such as violent and other forms of antisemitism in the Arab world, political instability, poverty, and expulsion. The history of the exodus has been politicized, given its proposed relevance to the historical narrative of the Arab–Israeli conflict. Those who view the Jewish exodus as analogous to the 1948 Palestinian expulsion and flight generally emphasize the push factors and consider those who left to have been refugees, while those who oppose that view generally emphasize the pull factors and consider the Jews to have been willing emigrants.

== North Africa ==
=== French colonial rule ===
In the 19th century, Francization of Jews in the French colonial North Africa, due to the work of organizations such as the Alliance Israelite Universelle and French policies such as the Algerian citizenship decree of 1870, resulted in a separation of the community from the local Muslims.

France began its conquest of Algeria in 1830. The following century had a profound influence on the status of the Algerian Jews; following the 1870 Crémieux Decree, they were elevated from the protected minority dhimmi status to French citizens. The decree began a wave of Pied-Noir-led anti-Jewish protests (such as the 1897 anti-Jewish riots in Oran), which the Muslim community did not participate in, to the disappointment of the European agitators. Though there were also cases of Muslim-led anti-Jewish riots, such as in Constantine in 1934 when 34 Jews were killed.

Neighbouring Husainid Tunisia began to come under European influence in the late 1860s and became a French protectorate in 1881. Since the 1837 accession of Ahmed Bey, and continued by his successor Muhammed Bey, Tunisia's Jews were elevated within Tunisia society with improved freedom and security, which was confirmed and safeguarded during the French protectorate." Around a third of Tunisian Jews took French citizenship during the protectorate.

Morocco, which had remained independent during the 19th century, became a French protectorate in 1912. However, during less than half a century of colonization, the equilibrium between Jews and Muslims in Morocco was upset, and the Jewish community was again positioned between the colonisers and the Muslim majority. French penetration into Morocco between 1906 and 1912 created significant Morocco Muslim resentment, resulting in nationwide protests and military unrest. During the period a number of anti-European or anti-French protests extended to include anti-Jewish manifestations, such as in Casablanca, Oujda and Fes in 1907–08 and later in the 1912 Fes riots.

The situation in colonial Libya was similar. As in the French North African countries, the Italian influence in Libya led to Libyan Jews being emancipated from the second class status they suffered under Libyan rule. Unwilling to return to a lesser status and believing that alignment with Italy would protect them from the Muslim majority, most Libyan Jews welcomed Italian rule.

The Alliance Israélite Universelle, founded in France in 1860, set up schools in Algeria, Morocco and Tunisia as early as 1863.

=== World War II ===
During World War II, Morocco, Algeria, Tunisia and Libya came under Nazi or Vichy French occupation and their Jews were subject to various forms of persecution. In Libya, the Axis powers established labor camps to which many Jews were forcibly deported. In other areas Nazi propaganda targeted Arab populations to incite them against British or French rule. National Socialist propaganda contributed to the transfer of racial antisemitism to the Arab world and is likely to have unsettled Jewish communities. An anti-Jewish riot took place in Casablanca in 1942 in the wake of Operation Torch, where a local mob attacked the Jewish mellah. (Mellah is the Moroccan name for a Jewish ghetto.) However, according to the Hebrew University of Jerusalem's Dr. Haim Saadon, "Relatively good ties between Jews and Muslims in North Africa during World War II stand in stark contrast to the treatment of their co-religionists by gentiles in Europe."

From 1943 until the mid-1960s, the American Jewish Joint Distribution Committee was an important foreign organization driving change and modernization in the North African Jewish community. It had initially become involved in the region whilst carrying out relief work during World War II.

=== Morocco ===
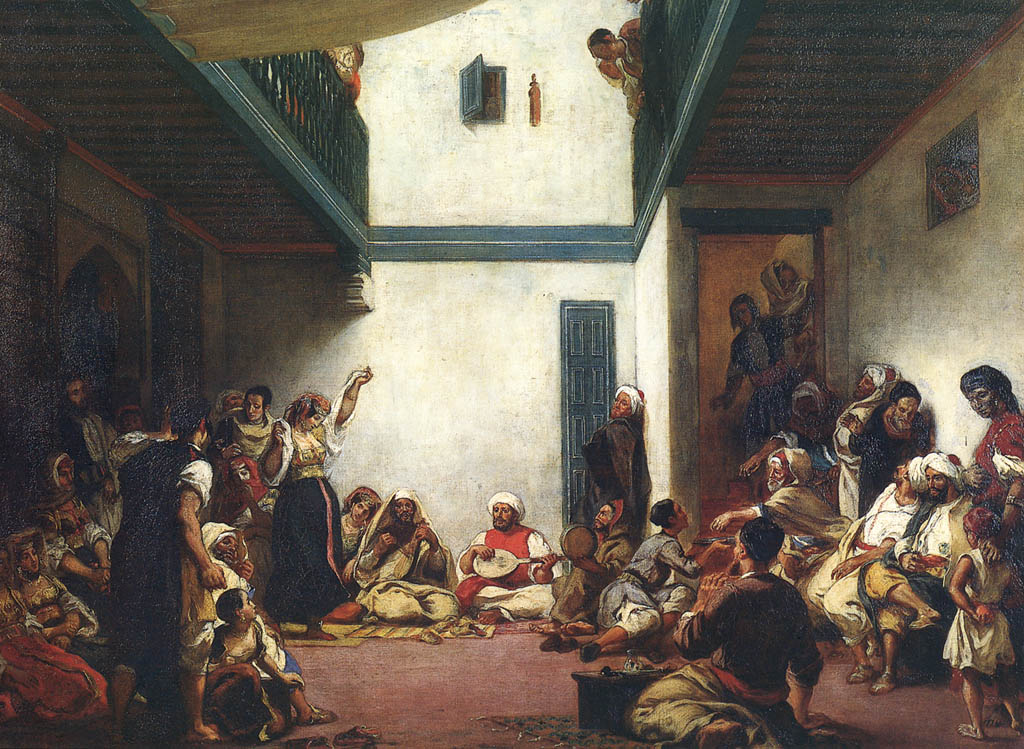
Jewish Wedding in Morocco by Eugène Delacroix, Louvre, Paris, 1839

Though foreign Zionist emissaries visited Morocco and sought to spread Zionism there from the early 20th century, there was no significant migration of Moroccan Jews to Palestine before 1948. After the establishment of Israel, migration was sponsored, facilitated and administered by Zionist organizations, notably through Cadima (1949–1956), the Framework (1956–1964), and Operation Yachin (1961–1964). As in Tunisia and Algeria, Moroccan Jews did not face large scale expulsion or outright asset confiscation or any similar government persecution during the period of exile, and Zionist agents were relatively allowed freedom of action to encourage emigration.

French antisemite and Nazi collaborator Xavier Vallat wanted to extend discriminatory legislature passed in France to exclude Jews from economic life to France's protectorates in Morocco and Tunisia. King Mohammed V expressed his personal distaste for these laws, assuring Moroccan Jewish leaders that he would never lay a hand "upon either their persons or property". While there is no concrete evidence of him actually taking any actions to defend Morocco's Jews, it has been argued that he may have worked on their behalf behind the scenes.

In June 1948, soon after Israel was established and in the midst of the first Arab–Israeli war, violent anti-Jewish riots broke out in Oujda and Djerada, leading to deaths of 44 Jews. In 1948–49, after the massacres, 18,000 Moroccan Jews left the country for Israel. Later, however, Jewish migration from Morocco slowed to a few thousand a year. Following Moroccan independence in 1956, a new wave of Moroccan Jews emigrated from the country towards South America, Israel, France, and Spain.

==== Cadima ====
The Caisse d’Aide aux Immigrants Marocains or Cadima (Hebrew: קדימה, 'forward') was the clandestine Zionist apparatus that arranged and oversaw the mass migration of Moroccan Jews to Israel from 1949 to 1956, during the final years of the French protectorate in Morocco. Cadima was administered by Jewish Agency and Mossad Le'Aliyah agents sent from Israel, with assistance from local Moroccan Zionists. It was based out of an office in Casablanca and operated cells in large cities as well as a transit camp along the road to al-Jadida, from which Jewish migrants would depart for Israel via Marseille.

Through the early 1950s, Zionist organizations encouraged immigration, particularly in the poorer south of the country, seeing Moroccan Jews as valuable contributors to the Jewish State:

The more I visited in these (Berber) villages and became acquainted with their Jewish inhabitants, the more I was convinced that these Jews constitute the best and most suitable human element for settlement in Israel's absorption centers. There were many positive aspects which I found among them: first and foremost, they all know (their agricultural) tasks, and their transfer to agricultural work in Israel will not involve physical and mental difficulties. They are satisfied with few (material needs), which will enable them to confront their early economic problems.

— Yehuda Grinker, The Emigration of Atlas Jews to Israel

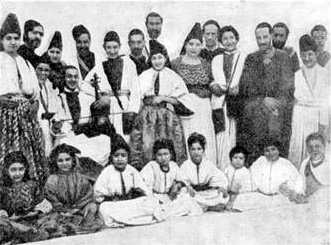
Jews of Fes, c. 1900

Incidents of anti-Jewish violence continued through the 1950s, although French officials later stated that Moroccan Jews "had suffered comparatively fewer troubles than the wider European population" during the struggle for independence. In August 1953, riots broke out in the city of Oujda and resulted in the death of four Jews, including an 11-year-old girl. In the same month, French security forces prevented a mob from breaking into the Jewish mellah of Rabat. In 1954, a nationalist event in the town of Petitjean (known today as Sidi Kacem) turned into an anti-Jewish riot and resulted in the death of 6 Jewish merchants from Marrakesh. However, according to Francis Lacoste, French Resident-General in Morocco, "the ethnicity of the Petitjean victims was coincidental, terrorism rarely targeted Jews, and fears about their future were unwarranted."

In 1955, a mob broke into the Jewish mellah in Mazagan (known today as El Jadida) and caused its 1,700 Jewish residents to flee to the European quarters of the city. The houses of some 200 Jews were too badly damaged during the riots for them to return. In 1954, Mossad had established an undercover base in Morocco, sending agents and emissaries within a year to appraise the situation and organize continuous emigration. The operations were composed of five branches: self-defense, information and intelligence, illegal immigration, establishing contact, and public relations. Mossad chief Isser Harel visited the country in 1959 and 1960, reorganized the operations, and created a clandestine militia named the "ha-Misgeret" ("the framework").

Jewish emigration to Israel jumped from 8,171 people in 1954 to 24,994 in 1955, increasing further in 1956. Between 1955 and independence in 1956, 60,000 Jews emigrated. On 7 April 1956, Morocco attained independence. Jews occupied several political positions, including three parliamentary seats and the cabinet position of Minister of Posts and Telegraphs. However, that minister, Leon Benzaquen, did not survive the first cabinet reshuffling, and no Jew was appointed again to a cabinet position. Although the relations with the Jewish community at the highest levels of government were cordial, these attitudes were not shared by the lower ranks of officialdom, which exhibited attitudes that ranged from traditional contempt to outright hostility. Morocco's increasing identification with the Arab world, and pressure on Jewish educational institutions to Arabize and conform culturally added to the fears of Moroccan Jews. Between 1956 and 1961, emigration to Israel was prohibited by law; clandestine emigration continued, and a further 18,000 Jews left Morocco.

On 10 January 1961 the Egoz, a Mossad-leased ship carrying Jews attempting to emigrate undercover, sank off the northern coast of Morocco. According to Tad Szulc, the Misgeret commander in Morocco, Alex Gattmon, decided to precipitate a crisis on the back of the tragedy, consistent with Mossad Director Isser Harel's scenario that "a wedge had to be forced between the royal government and the Moroccan Jewish community and that anti-Hassan nationalists had to be used as leverage as well if a compromise over emigration was ever to be attained". A pamphlet agitating for illegal emigration, supposedly by an underground Zionist organization, was printed by Mossad and distributed throughout Morocco, causing the government to "hit the roof". These events prompted King Mohammed V to allow Jewish emigration, and over the three following years, more than 70,000 Moroccan Jews left the country, primarily as a result of Operation Yachin.

In June 1961, reports surfaced regarding the continued removal of Jewish officials from prominent positions within the Moroccan government. M. Zaoui, the director of Conservation Fonciere in the Moroccan Finance Ministry, was dismissed without a specified reason. The extremist Muslim journal Al Oumal then launched a campaign against him, accusing him of Zionist affiliations. Earlier in the year, Meyer Toledano had also been removed from his role as judicial counselor to the Moroccan Foreign Ministry. Simultaneously, uneasiness arose among Moroccan Jews as they examined the 17 articles of the new "Fundamental Law" signed by King Hassan on 2 June. Article 15, in particular, raised concerns, emphasizing Morocco's commitment to the Arab League and the intention to strengthen ties with it. Although the new law did not revoke the equal rights of Jews and Muslims in Morocco, it notably omitted the term "Jew," and the first two articles underscored Morocco as an Arab and Muslim country with Islam as the official state religion.

==== Operation Yachin ====
Operation Yachin was fronted by the New York-based Hebrew Immigrant Aid Society (HIAS), who financed approximately $50 million of costs. HIAS provided an American cover for underground Israeli agents in Morocco, whose functions included organizing emigration, arming of Jewish Moroccan communities for self-defense and negotiations with the Moroccan government. By 1963, the Moroccan Interior Minister Colonel Oufkir and Mossad chief Meir Amit agreed to swap Israeli training of Moroccan security services and some covert military assistance for intelligence on Arab affairs and continued Jewish emigration.

By 1967, only 50,000 Jews remained. The 1967 Six-Day War led to increased Arab–Jewish tensions worldwide, including in Morocco, and significant Jewish emigration out of the country continued. By the early 1970s, the Jewish population of Morocco fell to 25,000; however, most of the emigrants went to France, Belgium, Spain, and Canada, rather than Israel.

According to Esther Benbassa, the migration of Jews from the North African countries was prompted by uncertainty about the future. In 1948, 250,000–265,000 Jews lived in Morocco. By 2001, an estimated 5,230 remained.

Despite their dwindling numbers, Jews continue to play a notable role in Morocco; the King retains a Jewish senior adviser, André Azoulay, and Jewish schools and synagogues receive government subsidies. Despite this, Jewish targets have sometimes been attacked (notably the 2003 bombing attacks on a Jewish community center in Casablanca), and there is sporadic antisemitic rhetoric from radical Islamist groups. Tens of thousands of Israeli Jews with Moroccan heritage visit Morocco every year, especially around Rosh Hashana or Passover, although few have taken up the late King Hassan II's offer to return and settle in Morocco.

=== Algeria ===
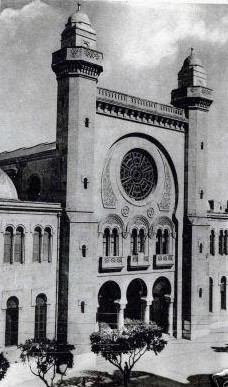
The Great Synagogue of Oran, Algeria, confiscated and turned into a mosque after the departure of Jews

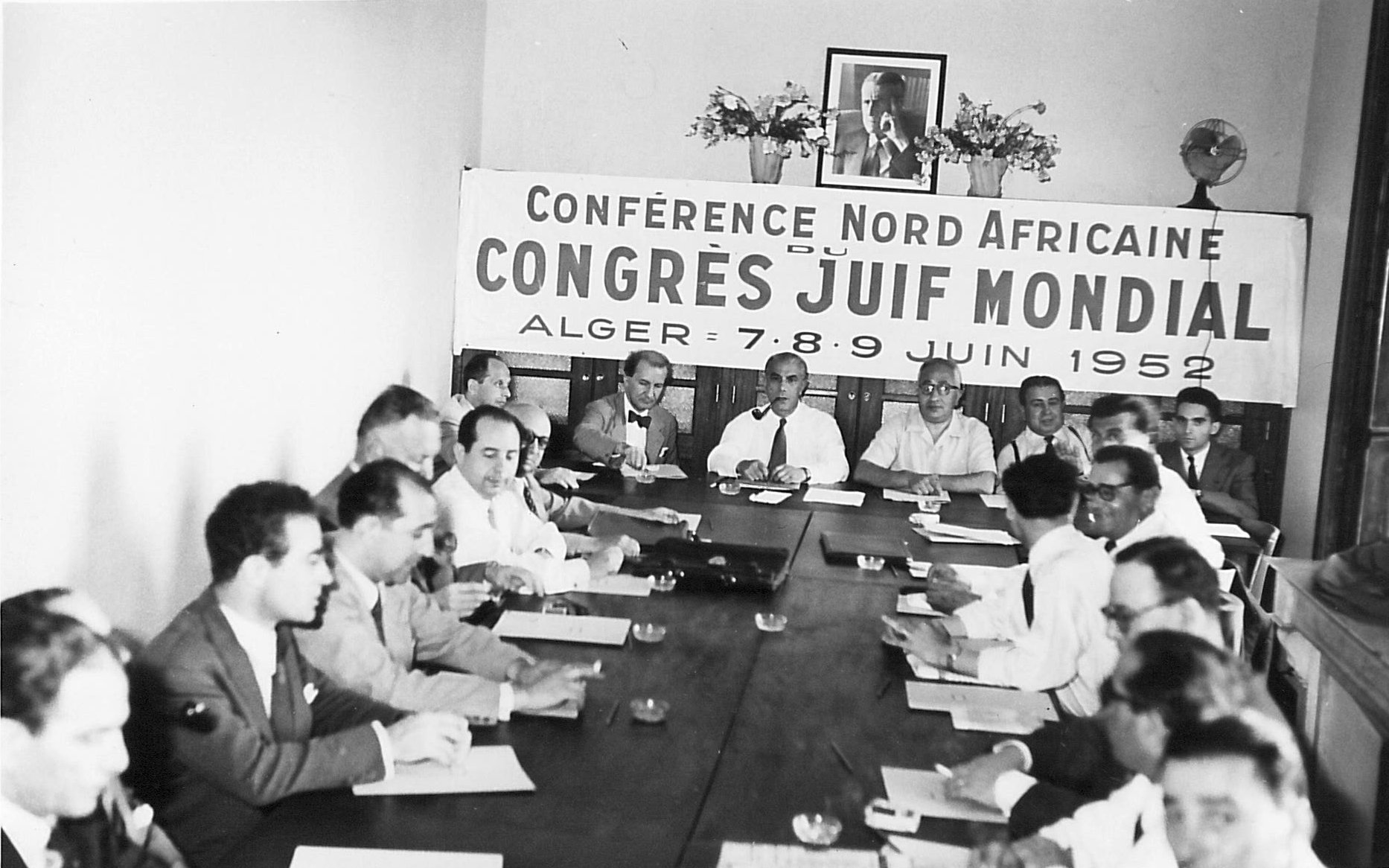
World Jewish Congress conference on the situation of Jews in North Africa, Algiers, 1952

As in Tunisia and Morocco, Algerian Jews did not face large scale expulsion or outright asset confiscation or any similar government persecution during the period of exile, and Zionist agents were relatively allowed freedom of action to encourage emigration.

Jewish emigration from Algeria was part of a wider ending of French colonial control and the related social, economic and cultural changes.

The Israeli government had been successful in encouraging Moroccan and Tunisian Jews to emigrate to Israel, but were less so in Algeria. Despite offers of visa and economic subsidies, only 580 Jews moved from Algeria to Israel in 1954–55.

Emigration peaked during the Algerian War of 1954–1962, during which thousands of Muslims, Christians and Jews left the country, particularly the Pied-Noir community. In 1956, Mossad agents worked underground to organize and arm the Jews of Constantine, who comprised approximately half the Jewish population of the country. In Oran, a Jewish counter-insurgency movement was thought to have been trained by former members of Irgun.

As of the last French census in Algeria, taken on 1 June 1960, there were 1,050,000 non-Muslim civilians in Algeria, constituting 10 percent of the total population; this included 130,000 Algerian Jews. After Algeria became independent in 1962, about 800,000 Pieds-Noirs (including Jews) were evacuated to mainland France while about 200,000 chose to remain in Algeria. Of the latter, there were still about 100,000 in 1965 and about 50,000 by the end of the 1960s.

As the Algerian Revolution intensified from the late 1950s onward, most of Algeria's 140,000 Jews began to leave. The community had lived mainly in Algiers and Blida, Constantine, and Oran.

Between late 1961 and late summer 1962, 130,000 of Algeria's approximately 140,000 Jews left for France, while about 10,000 of them emigrated to Israel. Their "repatriation" represents a unique case in the history of Jewish migration given that even though they were psychologically uprooted, they "returned" to France as citizens and not as refugees. Jewish migration from North Africa to France led to the rejuvenation of the French Jewish community, which is now the third largest in the world.

The Great Synagogue of Algiers was consequently abandoned after 1994.

=== Tunisia ===
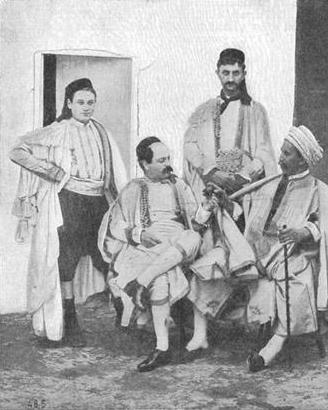
Jews of Tunis, c. 1900. From the Jewish Encyclopedia.

As in Morocco and Algeria, Tunisian Jews did not face large scale expulsion or outright asset confiscation or any similar government persecution during the period of exile, and Jewish emigration societes were relatively allowed freedom of action to encourage emigration.

In 1948, approximately 105,000 Jews lived in Tunisia. About 1,500 remain today, mostly in Djerba, Tunis, and Zarzis. Following Tunisia's independence from France in 1956 emigration of the Jewish population to Israel and France accelerated. After attacks in 1967, Jewish emigration both to Israel and France accelerated. There were also attacks in 1982, in 1985 following Israel's Operation Wooden Leg, and most recently in 2002 when a bombing in Djerba took 21 lives (most of them German tourists) near the local synagogue, a terrorist attack claimed by Al-Qaeda.

=== Libya ===
According to Maurice Roumani, a Libyan emigrant who was previously the executive director of WOJAC, the most important factors that influenced the Libyan Jewish community to emigrate were "the scars left from the last years of the Italian occupation and the entry of the British Military in 1943 accompanied by the Jewish Palestinian soldiers".

Zionist emissaries, so-called shlichim, had begun arriving in Libya in the early 1940s, with the intention to "transform the community and transfer it to Palestine". In 1943, Mossad LeAliyah Bet began to send emissaries to prepare the infrastructure for the emigration of the Libyan Jewish community.

In 1942, German troops fighting the Allies in North Africa occupied the Jewish quarter of Benghazi, plundering shops and deporting more than 2000 Jews across the desert. Sent to work in labor camps like Giado, more than one-fifth of that group of Jews perished. At the time, most Libyan Jews lived in the cities of Tripoli and Benghazi; there were smaller numbers in Bayda and Misrata. Following the Allied victory at the Battle of El Agheila in December 1942, German and Italian troops were driven out of Libya. The British assigned as garrison in Cyrenaica the Palestine Regiment. This unit later became the core of the Jewish Brigade, which was later also stationed in Tripolitania. The pro-Zionist soldiers encouraged the spread of Zionism throughout the local Jewish population.

Following the liberation of North Africa by Allied forces, antisemitic incitements were still widespread. The most severe racial violence between the start of World War II and the establishment of Israel erupted in Tripoli in November 1945. Over a period of several days more than 140 Jews (including 36 children) were killed, hundreds were injured, 4,000 were displaced and 2,400 were reduced to poverty. Five synagogues in Tripoli and four in provincial towns were destroyed, and over 1000 Jewish residences and commercial buildings were plundered in Tripoli alone. Gil Shefler writes that "As awful as the pogrom in Libya was, it was still a relatively isolated occurrence compared to the mass murders of Jews by locals in Eastern Europe." The same year, violent anti-Jewish violence also occurred in Cairo, which resulted in 10 Jewish victims.

In 1948, about 38,000 Jews lived in Libya. The pogroms continued in June 1948, when 15 Jews were killed and 280 Jewish homes destroyed. In November 1948, a few months after the events in Tripoli, the American consul in Tripoli, Orray Taft Jr., reported that: "There is reason to believe that the Jewish Community has become more aggressive as the result of the Jewish victories in Palestine. There is also reason to believe that the community here is receiving instructions and guidance from the State of Israel. Whether or not the change in attitude is the result of instructions or a progressive aggressiveness is hard to determine. Even with the aggressiveness or perhaps because of it, both Jewish and Arab leaders inform me that the inter-racial relations are better now than they have been for several years and that understanding, tolerance and cooperation are present at any top level meeting between the leaders of the two communities."

Immigration to Israel began in 1949, following the establishment of a Jewish Agency for Israel office in Tripoli. According to Harvey E. Goldberg, "a number of Libyan Jews" believe that the Jewish Agency was behind the riots, given that the riots helped them achieve their goal. Between the establishment of the State of Israel in 1948 and Libyan independence in December 1951 over 30,000 Libyan Jews emigrated to Israel.

On 31 December 1958, the President of the Executive Council of Tripolitania ordered the dissolution of the Jewish Community Council and the appointment of a Muslim commissioner nominated by the Government. A law issued in 1961 required Libyan citizenship for the possession and transfer of property in Libya, a requirement that was met by only six Libyan Jews. Jews were banned from voting, attaining public offices and from serving in the army or in police.

In 1967, during the Six-Day War, the Jewish population of over 4,000 was again subjected to riots in which 18 were killed and many more injured. The pro-Western Libyan government of King Idris tried unsuccessfully to maintain law and order. On 17 June 1967, Lillo Arbib, leader of the Jewish community in Libya, sent a formal request to Libyan prime minister Hussein Maziq requesting that the government "allow Jews so desiring to leave the country for a time, until tempers cool and the Libyan population understands the position of Libyan Jews, who have always been and will continue to be loyal to the State, in full harmony and peaceful coexistence with the Arab citizens at all times."

According to David Harris, the executive director of the Jewish advocacy organization AJC, the Libyan government "faced with a complete breakdown of law and order ... urged the Jews to leave the country temporarily", permitting them each to take one suitcase and the equivalent of $50. Through an airlift and the aid of several ships, over 4,000 Libyan Jews were evacuated to Italy by the Italian Navy, where they were assisted by the Jewish Agency for Israel. Of the Jews evacuated, 1,300 subsequently immigrated to Israel, 2,200 remained in Italy, and most of the rest went to the United States. A few scores remained in Libya. Some Libyan Jews who had been evacuated temporarily returned to Libya between 1967 and 1969 in an attempt to recover lost property. In September 1967 only 100 Jews remained in Libya, falling to less than 40 five years later in 1972 and just 16 by 1977.

On 21 July 1970 the Libyan government issued a law which confiscated assets of the Jews who had previously left Libya, issuing in their stead 15-year bonds. However, when the bonds matured in 1985 no compensation was paid. Libyan leader Muammar Gaddafi later justified this on the grounds that "the alignment of the Jews with Israel, the Arab nations' enemy, has forfeited their right to compensation."

Although the main synagogue in Tripoli was renovated in 1999, it has not reopened for services. In 2002, Esmeralda Meghnagi, who was thought to be the last Jew in Libya, died. However, that same year, it was discovered that Rina Debach, an 80-year old Jewish woman who was thought to be dead by her family in Rome, was still alive and living in a nursing home in the country. With her subsequent departure for Rome, there were no more Jews left in Libya.

Israel is home to a significant population of Jews of Libyan descent, who maintain their unique traditions. Jews of Libyan descent also make up a significant part of the Italian Jewish community. About 30% of the registered Jewish population of Rome is of Libyan origin.

== Middle East ==
=== Iraq ===
In the Soran Emirate specifically under the rule of Mir Muhammad the Jewish population was affected by violence and looting during the Siege of Amadiya. They “were treated with merciless cruelty and oppression." Many were forced to migrate and some fled the city after its fall. Similar reports are mentioned for other towns under his control, including Ranya, Khoy, Erbil, Aqra, and Zakho. Following the defeat of Mir Muhammad, Amadiya came under the rule of the Ottoman governor of Mosul. The situation of the Jewish community improved slightly.

==== 1930s and early 1940s ====
The British mandate over Iraq came to an end in June 1930, and in October 1932 the country became independent. The Iraqi government response to the demand of Assyrian autonomy (the Assyrians being the indigenous Eastern Aramaic-speaking Semitic descendants of the ancient Assyrians and Mesopotamians, and largely affiliated to the Assyrian Church of the East, Chaldean Catholic Church and Syriac Orthodox Church), turned into a bloody massacre of Assyrian villagers by the Iraqi army in August 1933.

This event was the first sign to the Jewish community that minority rights were meaningless under the Iraqi monarchy. King Faisal, known for his liberal policies, died in September 1933, and was succeeded by Ghazi, his nationalistic anti-British son. Ghazi began promoting Arab nationalist organizations, headed by Syrian and Palestinian exiles. With the 1936–39 Arab revolt in Palestine, they were joined by rebels, such as the Grand Mufti of Jerusalem. The exiles preached pan-Arab ideology and fostered anti-Zionist propaganda.

Under Iraqi nationalists, Nazi propaganda began to infiltrate the country, as Nazi Germany was anxious to expand its influence in the Arab world. Dr. Fritz Grobba, who resided in Iraq since 1932, began to vigorously and systematically disseminate hateful propaganda against Jews. Among other things, Arabic translation of Mein Kampf was published and Radio Berlin had begun broadcasting in Arabic language. Anti-Jewish policies had been implemented since 1934, and the confidence of Jews was further shaken by the growing crisis in Palestine in 1936. Between 1936 and 1939 ten Jews were murdered and on eight occasions bombs were thrown on Jewish locations.

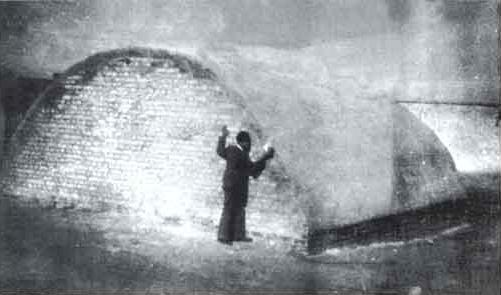
A mass grave of victims of the Farhud, 1941.

In 1941, immediately following the British victory in the Anglo-Iraqi War, riots known as the Farhud broke out in Baghdad in the power vacuum following the collapse of the pro-Axis government of Rashid Ali al-Gaylani while the city was in a state of instability. 180 Jews were killed and another 240 wounded; 586 Jewish-owned businesses were looted and 99 Jewish houses were destroyed.

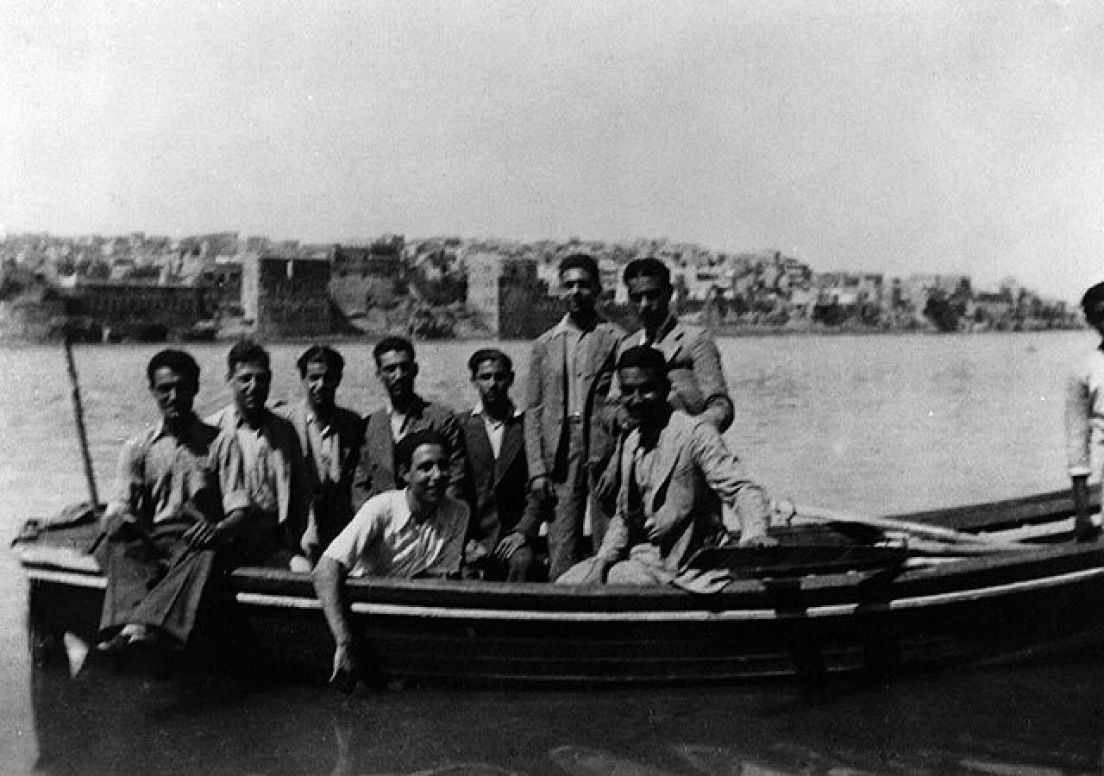
A group of young Iraqi Jews who fled to Palestine following the Farhud in Baghdad. They reached Palestine after considerable difficulties, including arrest, trial and imprisonment by the British authorities as well as deportation. 1941.

In some accounts the Farhud marked the turning point for Iraq's Jews. Other historians, however, see the pivotal moment for the Iraqi Jewish community much later, between 1948 and 1951, since Jewish communities prospered along with the rest of the country throughout most of the 1940s, and many Jews who left Iraq following the Farhud returned to the country shortly thereafter and permanent emigration did not accelerate significantly until 1950–51.

Either way, the Farhud is broadly understood to mark the start of a process of politicization of the Iraqi Jews in the 1940s, primarily among the younger population, especially as a result of the impact it had on hopes of long term integration into Iraqi society. In the direct aftermath of the Farhud, many joined the Iraqi Communist Party in order to protect the Jews of Baghdad, yet they did not want to leave the country and rather sought to fight for better conditions in Iraq itself. At the same time the Iraqi government that had taken over after the Farhud reassured the Iraqi Jewish community, and normal life soon returned to Baghdad, which saw a marked betterment of its economic situation during World War II.

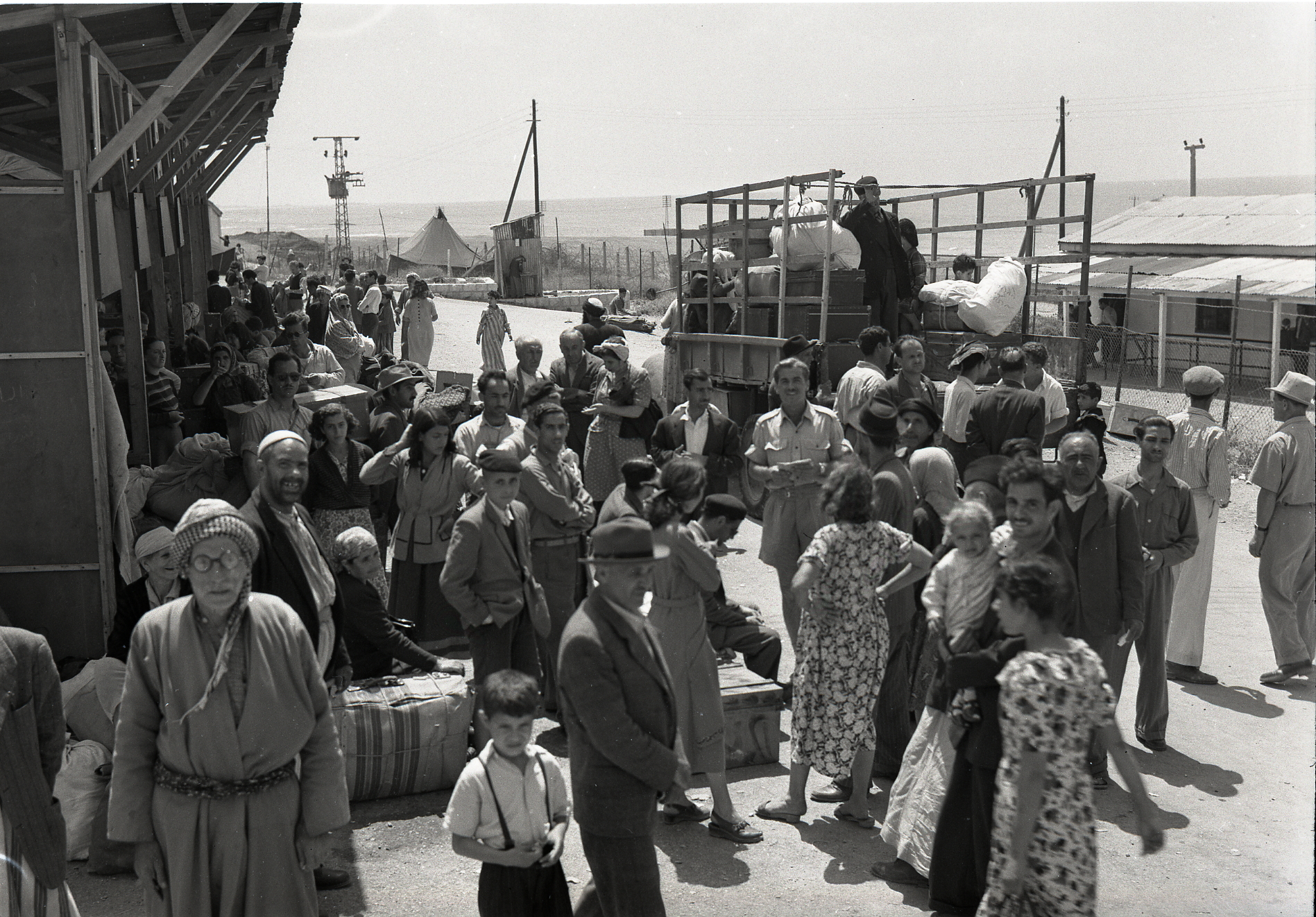
Iraqi refugees in a ma'abara, April 1951.

Shortly after the Farhud in 1941, Mossad LeAliyah Bet sent emissaries to Iraq to begin to organize emigration to Israel, initially by recruiting people to teach Hebrew and hold lectures on Zionism. In 1942, Shaul Avigur, head of Mossad LeAliyah Bet, entered Iraq undercover in order to survey the situation of the Iraqi Jews with respect to immigration to Israel. During the 1942–43, Avigur made four further trips to Baghdad to arrange the required Mossad machinery, including a radio transmitter for sending information to Tel Aviv, which remained in use for 8 years.

In late 1942, one of the emissaries explained the size of their task of converting the Iraqi community to Zionism, writing that "we have to admit that there is not much point in [organizing and encouraging emigration]. ... We are today eating the fruit of many years of neglect, and what we didn't do can't be corrected now through propaganda and creating one-day-old enthusiasm." It was not until 1947 that legal and illegal departures from Iraq to Israel began. Around 8,000 Jews left Iraq between 1919 and 1948, with another 2,000 leaving between mid-1948 to mid-1950.

==== 1948 Arab–Israeli War ====
In 1948, there were approximately 150,000 Jews in Iraq. The community was concentrated in Baghdad and Basra.

A few months before the UN vote on partition of Palestine, Iraq's prime minister Nuri al-Said told British diplomat Douglas Busk that he had nothing against the Iraqi Jews who were a long established and useful community. However, if the United Nations solution was not satisfactory, the Arab League might decide on severe measures against the Jews in Arab countries, and he would be unable to resist the proposal. In a speech at the General Assembly Hall at Flushing Meadow, New York, on Friday, 28 November 1947, Iraq's Foreign Minister, Fadel Jamall, included the following statement: "Partition imposed against the will of the majority of the people will jeopardize peace and harmony in the Middle East. Not only the uprising of the Arabs of Palestine is to be expected, but the masses in the Arab world cannot be restrained. The Arab–Jewish relationship in the Arab world will greatly deteriorate. There are more Jews in the Arab world outside of Palestine than there are in Palestine. In Iraq alone, we have about one hundred and fifty thousand Jews who share with Moslems and Christians all the advantages of political and economic rights. Harmony prevails among Moslems, Christians and Jews. But any injustice imposed upon the Arabs of Palestine will disturb the harmony among Jews and non-Jews in Iraq; it will breed inter-religious prejudice and hatred."

On 19 February 1949, al-Said acknowledged the bad treatment that the Jews had been victims of in Iraq during the recent months. He warned that unless Israel would behave itself, events might take place concerning the Iraqi Jews. Al-Said's threats had no impact at the political level on the fate of the Jews but were widely published in the media.

In 1948, the country was placed under martial law, and the penalties for Zionism were increased. Courts martial were used to intimidate wealthy Jews, Jews were again dismissed from civil service, quotas were placed on university positions, Jewish businesses were boycotted (E. Black, p. 347) and Shafiq Ades, one of the most important Jewish businessmen in the country (who was non-Zionist) was arrested and publicly hanged for allegedly selling goods to Israel. The Jewish community's general sentiment was that if a man as well connected and powerful as Ades could be eliminated by the state, other Jews would not be protected any longer.

Additionally, like most Arab League states, Iraq forbade any legal emigration of its Jews after the 1948 war on the grounds that they might go to Israel and could strengthen that state. At the same time, increasing government oppression of the Jews fueled by anti-Israeli sentiment together with public expressions of antisemitism created an atmosphere of fear and uncertainty.

However, by 1949 Jews were escaping Iraq at about a rate of 1,000 a month. At the time, the British believed that the Zionist underground was agitating in Iraq in order to assist US fund-raising and to "offset the bad impression caused by the Jewish attitudes to Arab refugees".

The Iraqi government took in only 5,000 of the approximately 700,000 Palestinians who became refugees in 1948–49, "despite British and American efforts to persuade Iraq" to admit more. In January 1949, the pro-British Iraqi Prime Minister Nuri al-Said discussed the idea of deporting Iraqi Jews to Israel with British officials, who explained that such a proposal would benefit Israel and adversely affect Arab countries. According to Meir-Glitzenstein, such suggestions were "not intended to solve either the problem of the Palestinian Arab refugees or the problem of the Jewish minority in Iraq, but to torpedo plans to resettle Palestinian Arab refugees in Iraq".

In July 1949 the British government proposed to Nuri al-Said a population exchange in which Iraq would agree to settle 100,000 Palestinian refugees in Iraq; Nuri stated that if a fair arrangement could be agreed, "the Iraqi government would permit a voluntary move by Iraqi Jews to Palestine." The Iraqi-British proposal was reported in the press in October 1949.

On 14 October 1949 Nuri al-Said raised the exchange of population concept with the economic mission survey. At the Jewish Studies Conference in Melbourne in 2002, Philip Mendes summarised the effect of al-Said's vacillations on Jewish expulsion as: "In addition, the Iraqi Prime Minister Nuri al-Said tentatively canvassed and then shelved the possibility of expelling the Iraqi Jews, and exchanging them for an equal number of Palestinian Arabs."

==== Temporary legalization of Jewish immigration to Israel ====
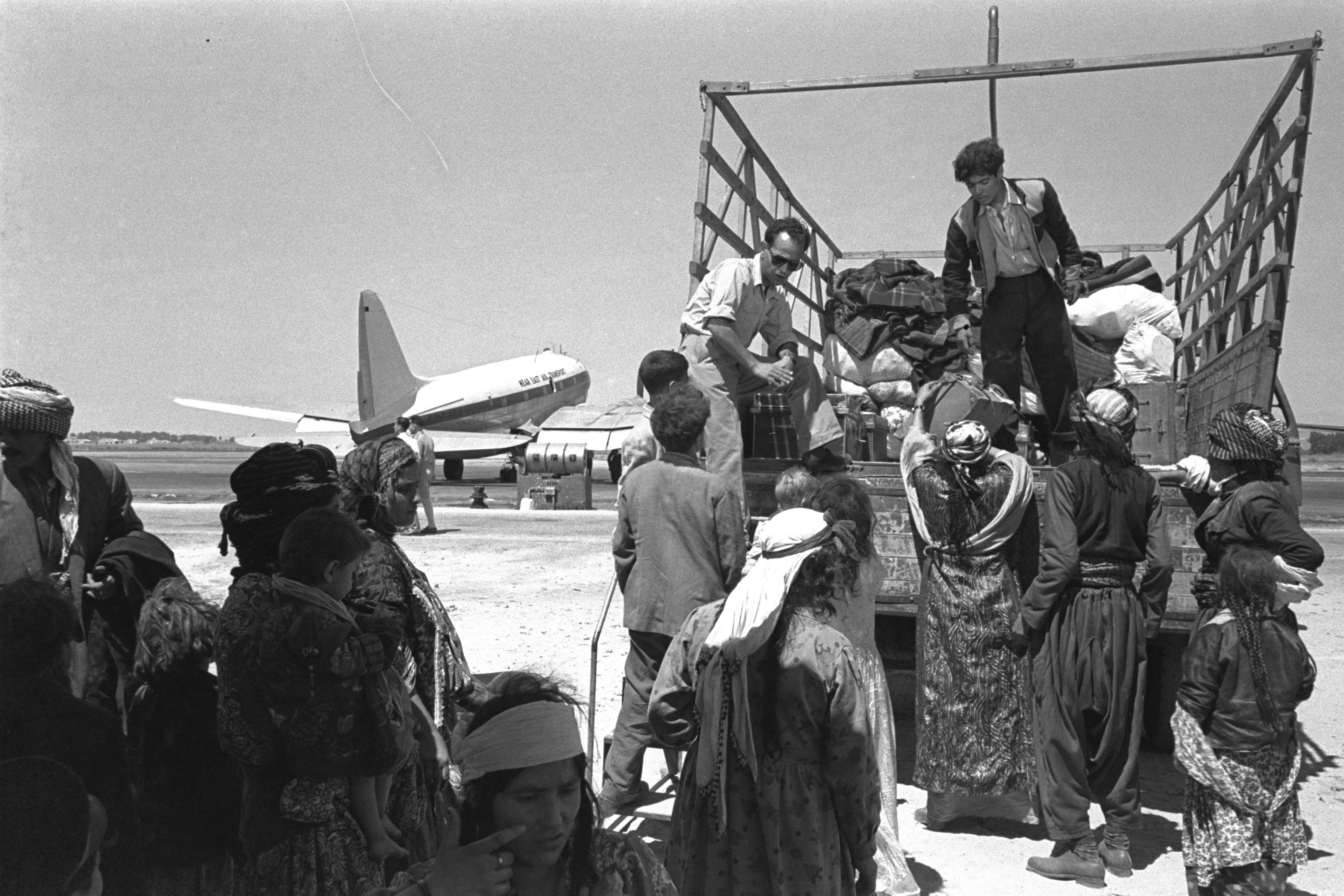
Iraqi Jews leaving Lod airport (Israel) on their way to ma'abara transit camp, 1951

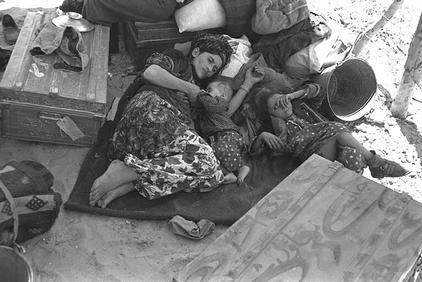
Displaced Iraqi Jews in Israel, 1951

In March 1950, Iraq reversed their earlier ban on Jewish emigration to Israel and passed a law of one-year duration allowing Jews to emigrate on the condition of relinquishing their Iraqi citizenship. According to Abbas Shiblak, many scholars state that this was a result of American, British and Israeli political pressure on Tawfiq al-Suwaidi's government, with some studies suggesting there were secret negotiations. According to Ian Black, the Iraqi government was motivated by "economic considerations, chief of which was that almost all the property of departing Jews reverted to the state treasury" and also that "Jews were seen as a restive and potentially troublesome minority that the country was best rid of." Israel mounted an operation called "Operation Ezra and Nehemiah" to bring as many of the Iraqi Jews as possible to Israel.

Immediately following the March 1950 Denaturalisation Act, the emigration movement faced significant challenges. Initially, local Zionist activists forbade the Iraqi Jews from registering for emigration with the Iraqi authorities, because the Israeli government was still discussing absorption planning. However, on 8 April, a bomb exploded in a Jewish cafe in Baghdad, and a meeting of the Zionist leadership later that day agreed to allow registration without waiting for the Israeli government; a proclamation encouraging registration was made throughout Iraq in the name of the State of Israel. However, at the same time immigrants were also entering Israel from Poland and Romania, countries in which Prime Minister David Ben-Gurion assessed there was a risk that the communist authorities would soon "close their gates", and Israel therefore delayed the transportation of Iraqi Jews. As a result, by September 1950, while 70,000 Jews had registered to leave, many selling their property and losing their jobs, only 10,000 had left the country. According to Esther Meir-Glitzenstein, "The thousands of poor Jews who had left or been expelled from the peripheral cities, and who had gone to Baghdad to wait for their opportunity to emigrate, were in an especially bad state. They were housed in public buildings and were being supported by the Jewish community. The situation was intolerable." The delay became a significant problem for the Iraqi government of Nuri al-Said (who replaced Tawfiq al-Suwaidi in mid-September 1950), as the large number of Jews "in limbo" created problems politically, economically and for domestic security. "Particularly infuriating" to the Iraqi government was that the source of the problem was the Israeli government.

As a result of these developments, al-Said was determined to drive the Jews out of his country as quickly as possible. On 21 August 1950 al-Said threatened to revoke the license of the company transporting the Jewish exodus if it did not fulfill its daily quota of 500 Jews, and in September 1950, he summoned a representative of the Jewish community and warned the Jewish community of Baghdad to make haste; otherwise, he would take the Jews to the borders himself.

Two months before the law expired, after about 85,000 Jews had registered, a bombing campaign began against the Jewish community of Baghdad. The Iraqi government convicted and hanged a number of suspected Zionist agents for perpetrating the bombings, but the issue of who was responsible remains a subject of scholarly dispute. All but a few thousand of the remaining Jews then registered for emigration. In all, about 120,000 Jews left Iraq. Historian Esther Meir-Glitzenstein disputed the claim that these bombings were the primary motive for the emigration of Iraqi Jews, noting that most accounts by these Jews did not mention the bombings as a cause for immigration.

According to Gat, it is highly likely that one of Nuri as-Said's motives in trying to expel large numbers of Jews was the desire to aggravate Israel's economic problems (he had declared as such to the Arab world), although Nuri was well aware that the absorption of these immigrants was the policy on which Israel based its future. The Iraqi Minister of Defence told the U.S. ambassador that he had reliable evidence that the emigrating Jews were involved in activities injurious to the state and were in contact with communist agents.

Between April 1950 and June 1951, Jewish targets in Baghdad were struck five times. Iraqi authorities then arrested 3 Jews, claiming they were Zionist activists, and sentenced two — Shalom Salah Shalom and Yosef Ibrahim Basri—to death. The third man, Yehuda Tajar, was sentenced to 10 years in prison. In May and June 1951, arms caches were discovered that allegedly belonged to the Zionist underground, allegedly supplied by the Yishuv after the Farhud of 1941. There has been much debate as to whether the bombs were planted by the Mossad to encourage Iraqi Jews to emigrate to Israel or if they were planted by Muslim extremists to help drive out the Jews. This has been the subject of lawsuits and inquiries in Israel.

The emigration law was to expire in March 1951, one year after the law was enacted. On 10 March 1951, 64,000 Iraqi Jews were still waiting to emigrate, the government enacted a new law blocking the assets of Jews who had given up their citizenship, and extending the emigration period.

The bulk of the Jews leaving Iraq did so via Israeli airlifts named Operation Ezra and Nehemiah with special permission from the Iraqi government.

==== After 1951 ====
A small Jewish community remained in Iraq following Operation Ezra and Nehemiah. Restrictions were placed on them after the Ba'ath Party came to power in 1963, and following the Six-Day War, persecution greatly increased. Jews had their property expropriated and bank accounts frozen, their ability to do business was restricted, they were dismissed from public positions, and were placed under house arrest for extended periods of time. In 1968, scores of Jews were imprisoned on charges of spying for Israel. In 1969, about 50 were executed following show trials, most infamously in a mass public hanging of 14 men including 9 Jews, and a hundred thousand Iraqis marched past the bodies in a carnival-like atmosphere. Jews began sneaking across the border to Iran, from where they proceeded to Israel or the UK. In the early 1970s, the Iraqi government permitted Jewish emigration and the majority of the remaining community left Iraq. By 2003, it was estimated that this once-thriving community had been reduced to 35 Jews in Baghdad and a handful more in Kurdish areas of the country.

=== Egypt ===
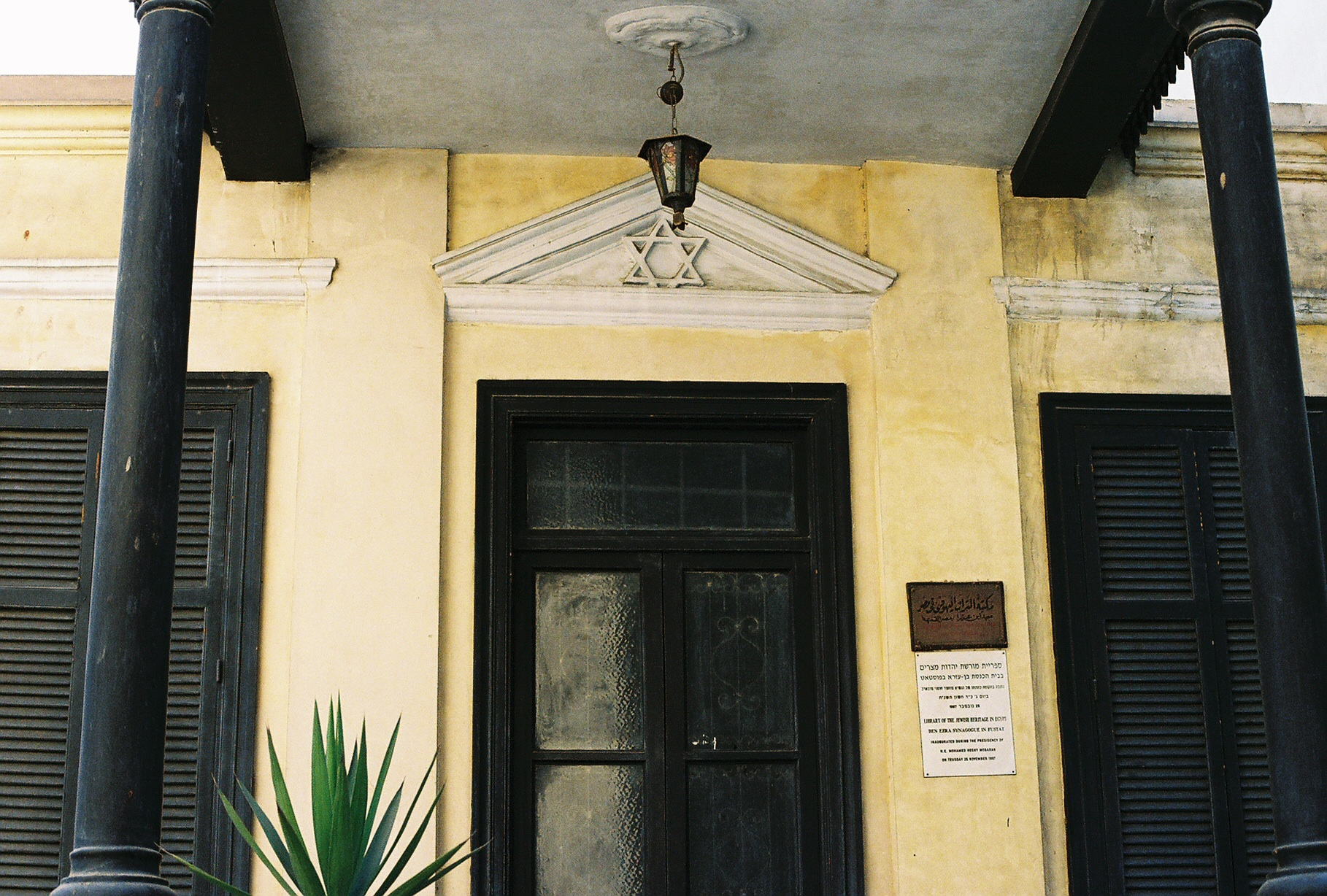
Ben Ezra Synagogue, Cairo

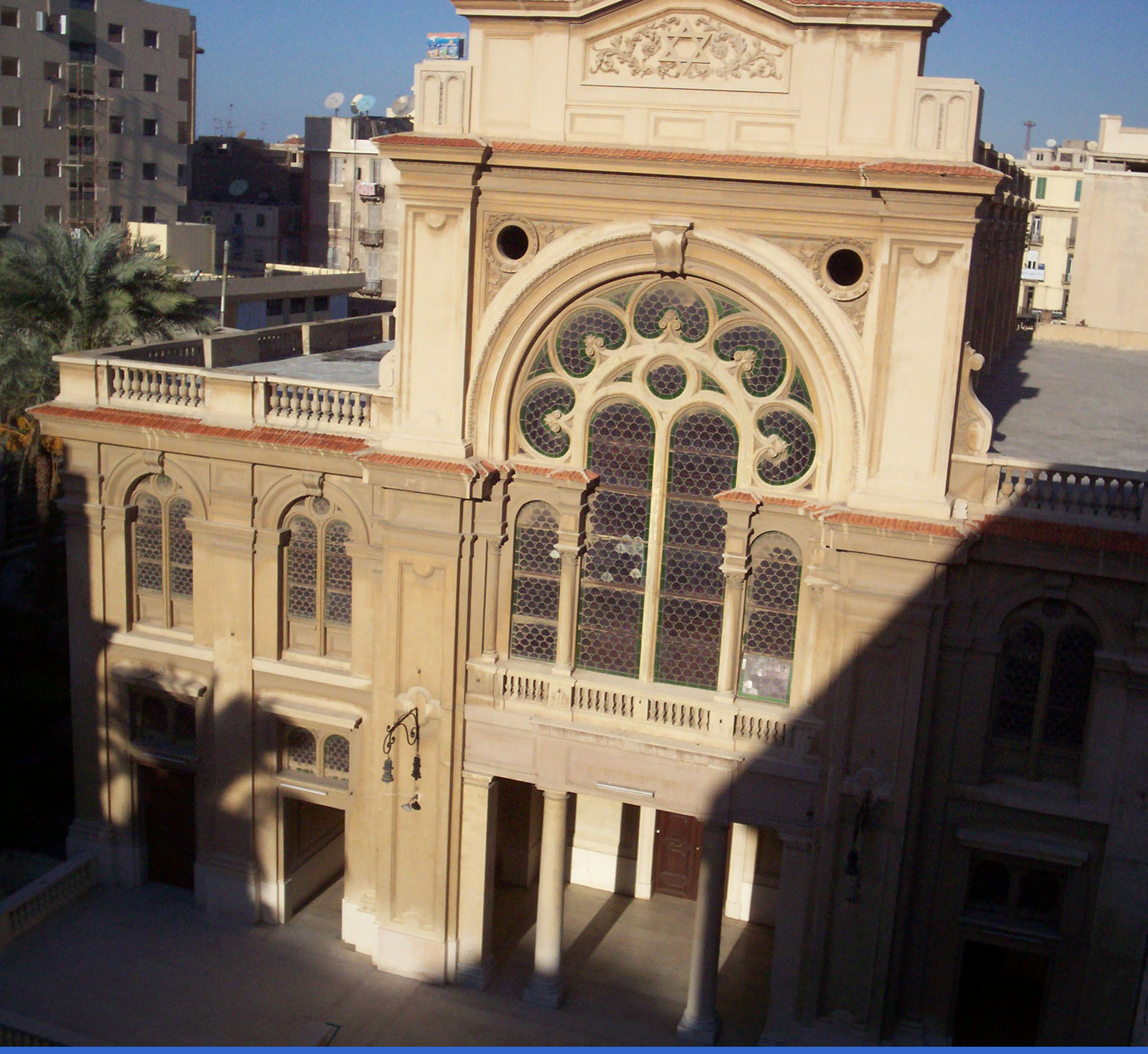
Eliyahu Hanavi Synagogue in Alexandria, Egypt

==== Anti-Jewish sentiment ====
Although there was a small indigenous community, most Jews in Egypt in the early twentieth century were recent immigrants to the country, who did not share the Arabic language and culture. Many were members of the highly diverse Mutamassirun community, which included other groups such as Greeks, Armenians, Syrian Christians and Italians, in addition to the British and French colonial authorities. Until the late 1930s, the Jews, both indigenous and new immigrants, like other minorities tended to apply for foreign citizenship in order to benefit from a foreign protection. The Egyptian government made it very difficult for non-Muslim foreigners to become naturalized. The poorer Jews, most of them indigenous and Oriental Jews, were left stateless, although they were legally eligible for Egyptian nationality. The drive to Egyptianize public life and the economy harmed the minorities, but the Jews had more strikes against them than the others. In the agitation against the Jews of the late thirties and the forties, the Jew was seen as an enemy The Jews were attacked because of their real or alleged links to Zionism. Jews were not discriminated because of their religion or race, like in Europe, but for political reasons.

The Egyptian Prime Minister Mahmoud an-Nukrashi Pasha told the British ambassador: "All Jews were potential Zionists [and] ... anyhow all Zionists were Communists." On 24 November 1947, the head of the Egyptian delegation to the United Nations General Assembly, Muhammad Hussein Heykal Pasha, said, "the lives of 1,000,000 Jews in Moslem countries would be jeopardized by the establishment of a Jewish state." On 24 November 1947, Dr Heykal Pasha said: "if the U.N decide to amputate a part of Palestine in order to establish a Jewish state, ... Jewish blood will necessarily be shed elsewhere in the Arab world ... to place in certain and serious danger a million Jews." Mahmud Bey Fawzi (Egypt) said: "Imposed partition was sure to result in bloodshed in Palestine and in the rest of the Arab world."

The exodus of the foreign mutamassirun ("Egyptianized") community, which included a significant number of Jews, began following the First World War, and by the end of the 1960s the entire mutamassirun was effectively eliminated. According to Andrew Gorman, this was primarily a result of the "decolonization process and the rise of Egyptian nationalism".

The exodus of Egyptian Jews was impacted by the 1945 Anti-Jewish Riots in Egypt, though such emigration was not significant as the government stamped the violence out and the Egyptian Jewish community leaders were supportive of King Farouk. In 1948, approximately 75,000 Jews lived in Egypt. Around 20,000 Jews left Egypt during 1948–49 following the events of the 1948 Arab–Israeli War (including the 1948 Cairo bombings). A further 5,000 left between 1952 and 1956, in the wake of the Egyptian Revolution of 1952 and later the false flag Lavon Affair. The Israeli invasion as part of the Suez Crisis caused a significant upsurge in emigration, with 14,000 Jews leaving in less than six months between November 1956 and March 1957, and 19,000 further emigrating over the next decade.

==== 1956 Suez Crisis ====
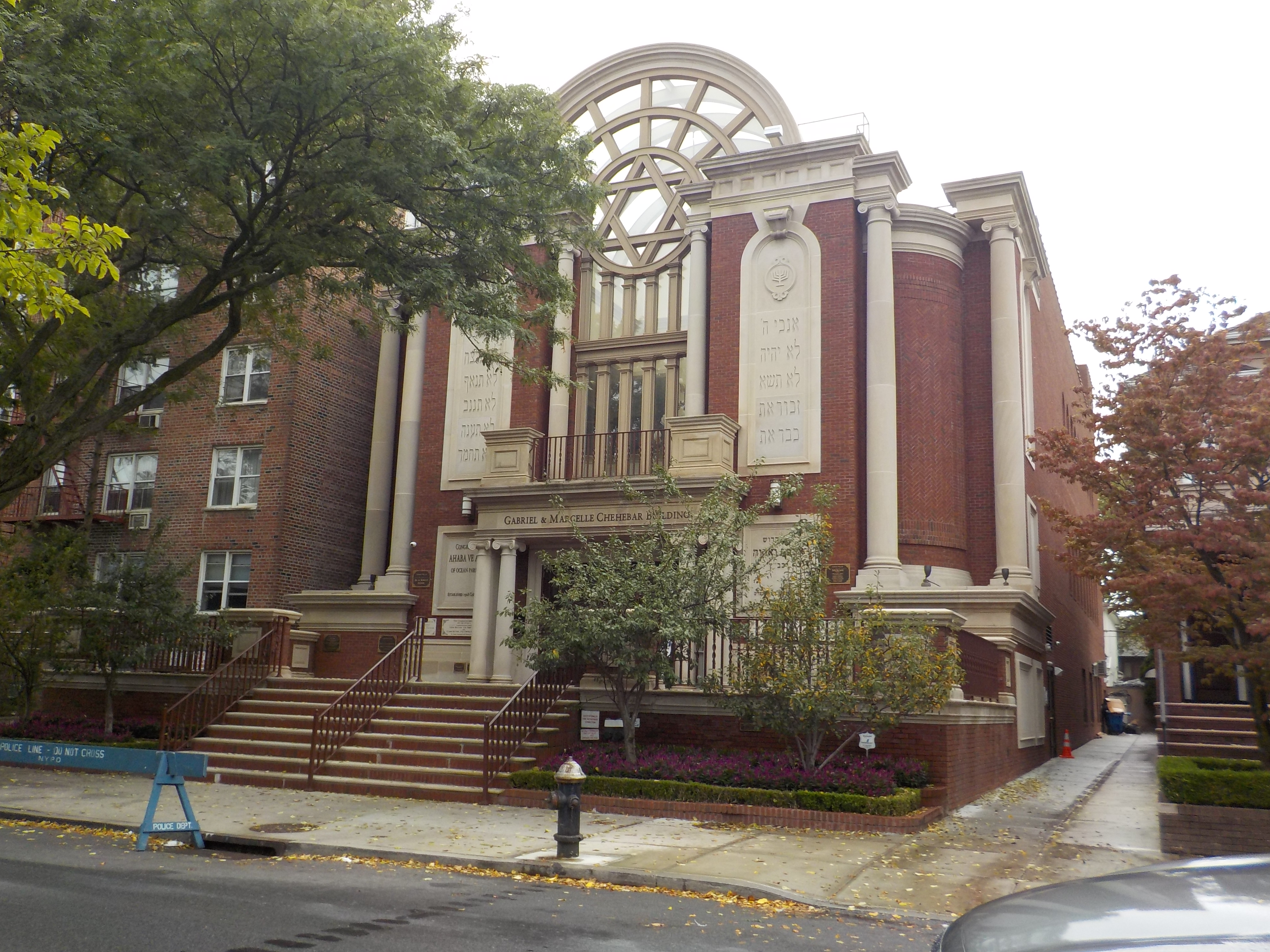
An Egyptian synagogue in the United States

In October 1956, when the Suez Crisis erupted, the position of the mutamassirun, including the Jewish community, was significantly impacted.

1,000 Jews were arrested and 500 Jewish businesses were seized by the government. A statement branding the Jews as "Zionists and enemies of the state" was read out in the mosques of Cairo and Alexandria. Jewish bank accounts were confiscated and many Jews lost their jobs. Lawyers, engineers, doctors and teachers were not allowed to work in their professions. Thousands of Jews were ordered to leave the country and told that they may be sent to concentration camps if they stayed. They were allowed to take only one suitcase and a small sum of cash, and forced to sign declarations "donating" their property to the Egyptian government. Foreign observers reported that members of Jewish families were taken hostage, apparently to insure that those forced to leave did not speak out against the Egyptian government. Jews were expelled or left, forced out by the anti-Jewish feeling in Egypt. Some 25,000 Jews, almost half of the Jewish community left, mainly for Europe, the United States, South America and Israel, after being forced to sign declarations that they were leaving voluntarily, and agreed with the confiscation of their assets. Similar measures were enacted against British and French nationals in retaliation for the invasion. By 1957 the Jewish population of Egypt had fallen to 15,000.

==== 1960s and 1970s ====
In 1960, the American embassy in Cairo wrote of Egyptian Jews that: "There is definitely a strong desire among most Jews to emigrate, but this is prompted by the feeling that they have limited opportunity, or from fear for the future, rather than by any direct or present tangible mistreatment at the hands of the government."

In 1967, Jews were detained and tortured, and Jewish homes were confiscated. The vast majority of Jewish men without foreign passports were detained. Following the Six Day War, the community fell to 2,500 members and by the 1970s practically ceased to exist, with the exception of a few remaining families. As of 2015, an estimated 30 Jews remained in Egypt, most of them elderly.

=== Yemen ===
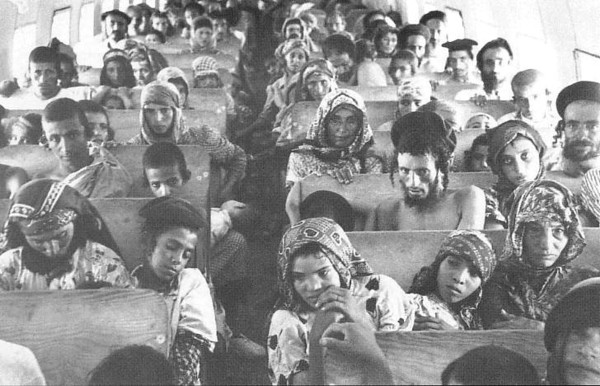
Yemenite Jews en route from Aden to Israel, during the Operation Magic Carpet (1949–1950)

The Yemeni exodus began in 1881, seven months prior to the more well-known First Aliyah from Eastern Europe. The exodus came about as a result of European Jewish investment in the Mutasarrifate of Jerusalem, which created jobs for labouring Jews alongside local Muslim labour thereby providing an economic incentive for emigration. This was aided by the reestablishment of Ottoman control over the Yemen Vilayet allowing freedom of movement within the empire, and the opening of the Suez canal, which reduced the cost of travelling considerably. Between 1881 and 1948, 15,430 Jews had immigrated to Palestine legally.

In 1942, prior to the formulation of the One Million Plan, David Ben-Gurion described his intentions with respect to such potential policy to a meeting of experts and Jewish leaders, stating that "It is a mark of great failure by Zionism that we have not yet eliminated the Yemen exile [diaspora]."

If one includes Aden, there were about 63,000 Jews in Yemen in 1948. In 1947, rioters killed at least 80 Jews in Aden, a British colony in southern Yemen. In 1948 the new Zaydi Imam Ahmad bin Yahya unexpectedly allowed his Jewish subjects to leave Yemen, and tens of thousands poured into Aden. The Israeli government's Operation Magic Carpet evacuated around 44,000 Jews from Yemen to Israel in 1949 and 1950. Emigration continued until 1962, when the civil war in Yemen broke out. A small community remained until 1976, though it has mostly immigrated from Yemen since. In March 2016, the Jewish population in Yemen was estimated to be about 50.

=== Lebanon and Syria ===
==== Background ====
The area now known as Lebanon and Syria was the home of one of the oldest Jewish communities in the world, dating back to at least 300 BCE.

==== Lebanon ====
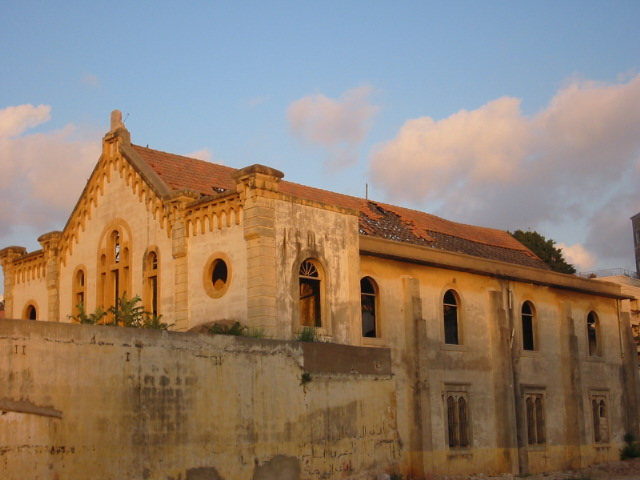
Maghen Abraham Synagogue in Beirut, Lebanon

In November 1945, fourteen Jews were killed in anti-Jewish riots in Tripoli. Unlike in other Arab countries, the Lebanese Jewish community did not face grave peril during the 1948 Arab–Israel War and was reasonably protected by governmental authorities. Lebanon was also the only Arab country that saw a post-1948 increase in its Jewish population, principally due to the influx of Jews coming from Syria and Iraq.

The 1932 national census puts the country's Jewish population at around 3,500. In 1948, there were approximately 5,200 Jews in Lebanon. Their number increased after the first Arab-Israeli war to roughly 9000 in 1951, including an estimated 2,000 Jewish asylum seekers. The largest communities of Jews in Lebanon were in Beirut, and the villages near Mount Lebanon, Deir al Qamar, Barouk, Bechamoun, and Hasbaya. While the French mandate saw a general improvement in conditions for Jews, the Vichy regime placed restrictions on them. The Jewish community actively supported Lebanese independence after World War II and had mixed attitudes toward Zionism.

However, negative attitudes toward Jews increased after 1948, and, by 1967, most Lebanese Jews had emigrated—to Israel, the United States, Canada, and France. In 1971, Albert Elia, the 69-year-old Secretary-General of the Lebanese Jewish community, was kidnapped in Beirut by Syrian agents and imprisoned under torture in Damascus, along with Syrian Jews who had attempted to flee the country. A personal appeal by the U.N. High Commissioner for Refugees, Prince Sadruddin Aga Khan, to the late President Hafez al-Assad failed to secure Elia's release.

The remaining Jewish community was particularly hard hit by the civil war in Lebanon, and by the mid-1970s, the community collapsed. In the 1980s, Hezbollah kidnapped several Lebanese Jewish businessmen, and in the 2004 elections, only one Jew voted in the municipal elections. There are now only between 20 and 40 Jews living in Lebanon.

==== Syria ====
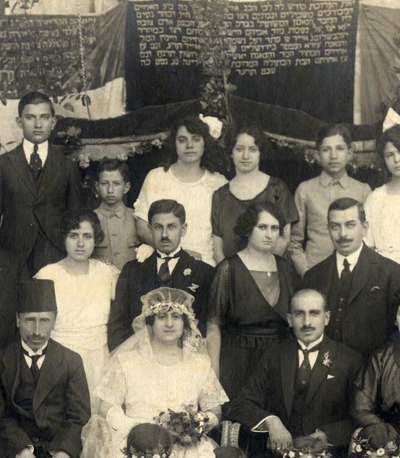
A Jewish wedding in Aleppo, Syria (Ottoman Empire), 1914.

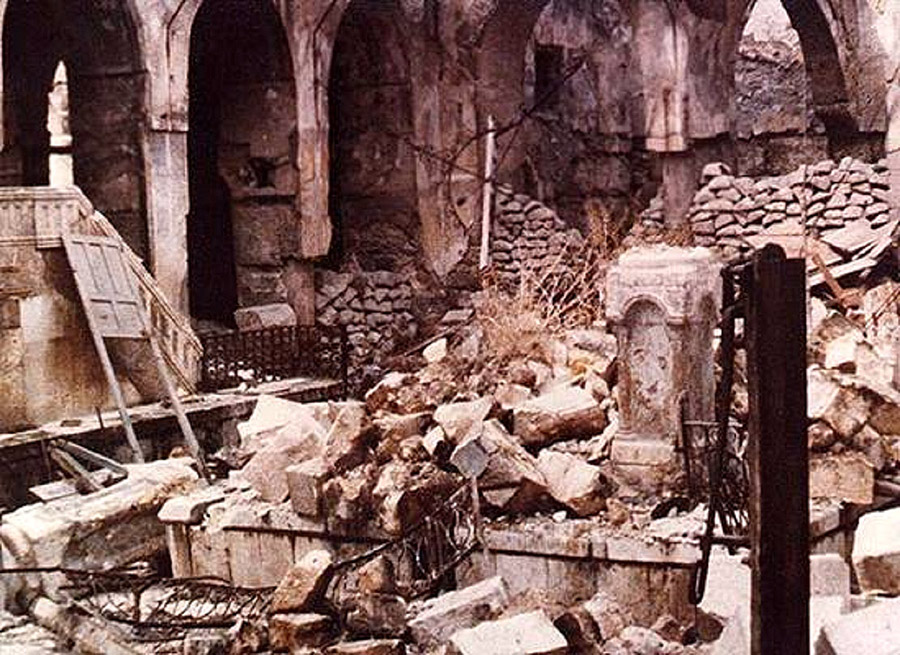
Ruins of the Central Synagogue of Aleppo after the 1947 Aleppo pogrom

In 1947, rioters in Aleppo burned the city's Jewish quarter and killed 75 people. As a result, nearly half of the Jewish population of Aleppo opted to leave the city, initially to neighbouring Lebanon.

In 1948, there were approximately 30,000 Jews in Syria. In 1949, following defeat in the Arab–Israeli War, the CIA-backed March 1949 Syrian coup d'état installed Husni al-Za'im as the President of Syria. Za'im permitted the emigration of large numbers of Syrian Jews, and 5,000 left to Israel.

The subsequent Syrian governments placed severe restrictions on the Jewish community, including barring emigration. In 1948, the government banned the sale of Jewish property and in 1953 all Jewish bank accounts were frozen. The Syrian secret police closely monitored the Jewish community. Over the following years, many Jews managed to escape, and the work of supporters, particularly Judy Feld Carr, in smuggling Jews out of Syria, and bringing their plight to the attention of the world, raised awareness of their situation.

Although the Syrian government attempted to stop Syrian Jews from exporting their assets, the American consulate in Damascus noted in 1950 that "the majority of Syrian Jews have managed to dispose of their property and to emigrate to Lebanon, Italy, and Israel". In November 1954, the Syrian government temporarily lifted its ban on Jewish emigration. The various restrictions that the Syrian government placed on the Jewish population were severe. Jews were legally barred from working for the government or for banks, obtaining driver's licenses, having telephones in their homes or business premises, or purchasing property.

In March 1964, the Syrian government issued a decree prohibiting Jews from traveling more than three miles from the limits of their hometowns. In 1967, in the aftermath of the Six-Day War, antisemitic riots broke out in Damascus and Aleppo. Jews were allowed to leave their homes only for few hours daily. Many Jews found it impossible to pursue their business ventures because the larger community was boycotting their products. In 1970, Israel launched Operation Blanket, a covert military and intelligence operation to evacuate Syrian Jews, managing to bring a few dozen young Jews to Israel.

Clandestine Jewish emigration continued, as Jews attempted to sneak across the borders into Lebanon or Turkey, often with the help of smugglers, and make contact with Israeli agents or local Jewish communities. In 1972, demonstrations were held by 1,000 Syrian Jews in Damascus, after four Jewish women were killed as they attempted to flee Syria. The protest surprised Syrian authorities, who closely monitored Jewish community, eavesdropped on their telephone conversations, and tampered with their mail.

Following the Madrid Conference of 1991, the United States put pressure on the Syrian government to ease its restrictions on Jews, and during Passover in 1992, the government of Syria began granting exit visas to Jews on condition that they did not emigrate to Israel. At that time, the country had several thousand Jews. The majority left for the United States—most to join the large Syrian Jewish community in South Brooklyn, New York—although some went to France and Turkey, and 1262 Syrian Jews who wanted to immigrate to Israel were brought there in a two-year covert operation.

In 2004, the Syrian government attempted to establish better relations with its emigrants, and a delegation of a dozen Jews of Syrian origin visited Syria in the spring of that year. As of December 2014, only 17 Jews remain in Syria, according to Rabbi Avraham Hamra; nine men and eight women, all over 60 years of age.

=== Transjordan and Jordanian-annexed West Bank ===
==== Depopulation of local Jewish communities ====
Following the 1948 Arab–Israeli War and the 1949 Armistice Agreements, all Jewish communities in Transjordan, the Jordanian-annexed West Bank, and the Egyptian-occupied Gaza Strip were depopulated.

The communities and localities affected included the Jerusalem Jewish Quarter, Hebron, Ein Tzurim, Masu'ot Yitzhak, Revadim, Beit HaArava, Kalya, Kfar Etzion, Atarot, Kfar Darom, Neve Yaakov, and Tel Or.

In many cases, these depopulations represented final stages of earlier evacuations begun in response to both the 1929 Palestine riots and 1936–1939 Arab Revolt. The Hebron Jewish Community, already having lost a majority of its population as a result of mandatory British evacuation following the 1929 Hebron Massacre, lost its sole remaining Jewish resident Ya'akov Ben Shalom Ezra during the war. Kfar Darom, the last of the Gaza Jewish communities following mandatory evacuations in 1929, was itself ultimately abandoned following a three-month siege by the Egyptian army in 1948.

In the case of Dead Sea-region kibbutzim of Beit HaArava and Kalya, negotiations with Transjordan's King Abdullah were conducted in an attempt for residents to remain. When those talks failed, the villagers fled by boat to an Israeli military post at Mount Sodom.

Judean settlements Kfar Etzion, a kibbutz established southwest of Bethlehem, and Jerusalem adjascent Atarot and Neve Yaakov fared less peacefully during the conflict. All three villages were besieged by a combined force of Arab Legion and local irregulars, resulting in complete evacuation of Atarot and Neve Yaakov, and massacre of 127 of Etzion's defending force and citizens.

The village of Tel Or had the distinction of being the only Jewish locality permitted in Transjordan proper at the time. Established in 1930 in the vicinity of the Naharayim hydroelectric power plant, the village of was built as a housing compound for Jewish crews operating the power plant, and their families. Following a prolonged battle between Yishuv forces and the Arab Legion in the area, the residents of Tel Or were given an ultimatum to surrender or leave the village.

==== Depopulation of Jerusalem's Jewish Quarter ====
The largest depopulation during the war occurred in Jerusalem's Jewish Quarter, where its entire population of about 2,000 Jews were besieged and ultimately forced to leave en masse. The defenders surrendered on 28 May 1948.

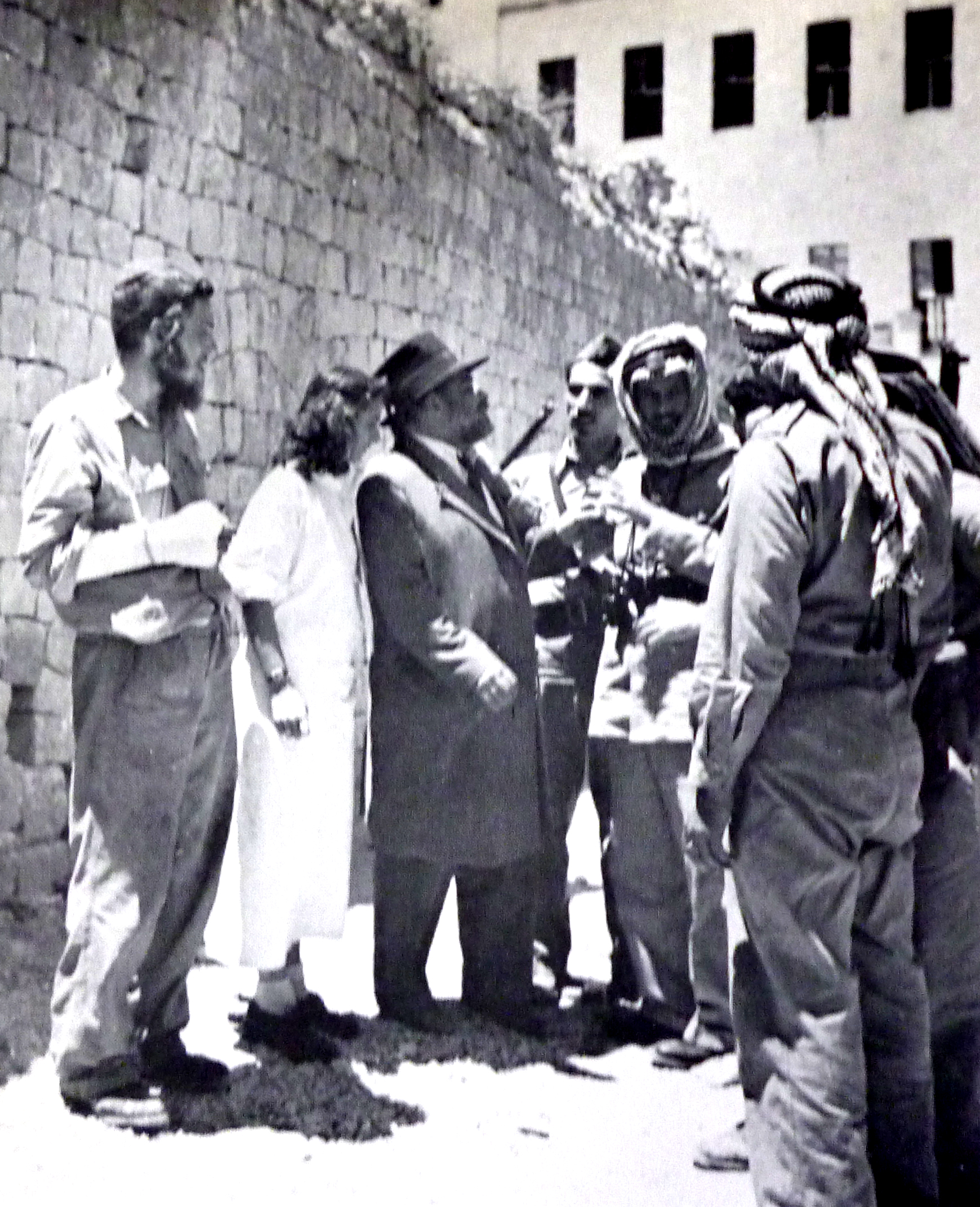
Weingarten negotiating the surrender with Arab Legion soldiers

The Jordanian commander is reported to have told his superiors: "For the first time in 1,000 years not a single Jew remains in the Jewish Quarter. Not a single building remains intact. This makes the Jews' return here impossible."

=== Bahrain ===
Bahrain's tiny Jewish community, mostly the Jewish descendants of immigrants who entered the country in the early 20th century from Iraq, numbered between 600 and 1,500 in 1948. In the wake of 29 November 1947 U.N. Partition vote, demonstrations against the vote in the Arab world were called for 2–5 December. The first two days of demonstrations in Bahrain saw rock-throwing against Jews, but on 5 December, mobs in the capital of Manama looted Jewish homes and shops, destroyed the synagogue, beat any Jews they could find, and murdered one elderly woman.

As a result, many Bahraini Jews fled Bahrain. Some remained behind, but after riots broke out following the Six-Day War, the majority left. Bahraini Jews emigrated mainly to Israel (where a particularly large number settled in Pardes Hanna-Karkur), the United Kingdom, and the United States. As of 2006, only 36 Jews remained.

=== Iran ===
The exodus of Iran's Jews refers to the emigration of Persian Jews from Pahlavi Iran in the 1950s and a later migration wave from Iran during and after the Iranian Revolution of 1979. At the time of Israeli independence in 1948, there were an estimated 140,000 to 150,000 Jews in Iran. Between 1948 and 1953, about one-third of Iranian Jews immigrated to Israel. Between 1948 and 1978, an estimated 70,000 Iranian Jews immigrated to Israel. In the aftermath of the Iranian revolution and theocratic islamist rule the Jewish population had further dwindled according to Persian Jewish testimonies the community currently faces threats from pro-regime elements within the Iran. Jews had been harassed, threatened, and forced to vocally support the Iranian government.

==== 1979 Islamic Revolution ====
In 1979, the year of the Islamic Revolution, there were about 80,000 Jews in Iran. In the aftermath of the revolution, emigration reduced the community to less than 20,000. The migration of Persian Jews after Iranian Revolution was mainly due to fear of religious persecution, economic hardships and insecurity after the deposition of the Shah regime and consequent internal violence and the Iran–Iraq War. In the years following the Islamic Revolution, about 31,000 Jews emigrated from Iran, of whom about 36,000 went to the United States, 20,000 to Israel, and 5000 to Europe.

While antisemitism in Iran is not as severe as in Europe and the Arab world, the strong anti-Zionist policy of the Islamic Republic of Iran created a tense and uncomfortable situation for Iranian Jews, who became vulnerable to accusations of alleged collaboration with Israel. In total, more than 80% of Iranian Jews fled or migrated from the country between 1979 and 2006.

=== Turkey ===
When the Republic of Turkey was established in 1923, Aliyah was not particularly popular among Turkish Jewry; migration from Turkey to Palestine was minimal in the 1920s.

During 1923–1948, approximately 7,300 Jews emigrated from Turkey to Palestine. After the 1934 Thrace pogroms following the 1934 Turkish Resettlement Law, immigration to Palestine increased; it is estimated that 521 Jews left for Palestine from Turkey in 1934 and 1,445 left in 1935. Immigration to Palestine was organized by the Jewish Agency and the Palestine Aliya Anoar Organization. The Varlık Vergisi, a capital tax established in 1942, was also significant in encouraging emigration from Turkey to Palestine; between 1943 and 1944, 4,000 Jews emigrated."

The Jews of Turkey reacted very favorably to the creation of the State of Israel. Between 1948 and 1951, 34,547 Jews immigrated to Israel, nearly 40% of the Jewish population at the time. Immigration was stunted for several months in November 1948, when Turkey suspended migration permits as a result of pressure from Arab countries.

In March 1949, the suspension was removed when Turkey officially recognized Israel, and emigration continued, with 26,000 emigrating within the same year. The migration was entirely voluntary, and was primary driven by economic factors given the majority of emigrants were from the lower classes. In fact, the migration of Jews to Israel is the second largest mass emigration wave out of Turkey, the first being the population exchange between Greece and Turkey.

After 1951, emigration of Jews from Turkey to Israel slowed materially.

In the mid-1950s, 10% of those who had moved to Israel returned to Turkey. A new synagogue, the Neve Şalom, was constructed in Istanbul in 1951. Generally, Turkish Jews in Israel have integrated well into society and are not distinguishable from other Israelis. However, they maintain their Turkish culture and connection to Turkey, and are strong supporters of close relations between Israel and Turkey.

Even though historically speaking populist antisemitism was rarer in the Ottoman Empire and Anatolia than in Europe, historic antisemitism still existed in the empire, started from the maltreatment of Jewish Yishuv prior to World War I, but most notably, the 1917 Tel Aviv and Jaffa deportation, which was considered as the first anti-Semitic act by the empire. Since the establishment of the state of Israel in 1948, there has been a rise in anti-Semitism. On the night of 6–7 September 1955, the Istanbul pogrom was unleashed. Although primarily aimed at the city's Greek population, the Jewish and Armenian communities of Istanbul were also targeted to a degree. The caused damage was mainly material — more than 4,000 shops and 1,000 houses belonging to Greeks, Armenians and Jews were destroyed - but it deeply shocked minorities throughout the country

Since 1986, increased attacks on Jewish targets throughout Turkey impacted the security of the community, and urged many to emigrate. The Neve Shalom Synagogue in Istanbul has been attacked by Islamic militants three times. On 6 September 1986, Arab terrorists gunned down 22 Jewish worshippers and wounded 6 during Shabbat services at Neve Shalom. This attack was blamed on the Palestinian militant Abu Nidal. In 1992, the Lebanon-based Shi'ite Muslim group of Hezbollah carried out a bombing against the synagogue, but nobody was injured. The synagogue was hit again during the 2003 Istanbul bombings alongside the Bet Israel Synagogue, killing 20 and injuring over 300 people, both Jews and Muslims.

With the increasing anti-Israeli and anti-Jewish attitudes in modern Turkey, especially under the Turkish government of Recep Tayyip Erdoğan, the country's Jewish community, while still believed to be the largest among Muslim countries, declined from about 26,000 in 2010 to about 17,000–18,000 in 2016.

== Other Muslim-majority countries ==
=== Afghanistan ===
The Afghan Jewish community declined from about 40,000 in the early 20th century to 5,000 by 1934 due to persecution. Many Afghan Jews fled to Persia, although some came to Palestine.

Following the Kazakh famine of 1930–1933, a significant number of Bukharan Jews crossed the border into the Kingdom of Afghanistan as part of the wider famine-related refugee crisis; leaders of the communities petitioned Jewish communities in Europe and the United States for support. In total, some 60000 refugees had fled from the Soviet Union and reached Afghanistan. In 1932, Mohammed Nadir Shah signed a border treaty with the Soviets in order to prevent asylum seekers from crossing into Afghanistan from Soviet Central Asia. Later that year, Afghanistan began deporting Soviet-origin refugees either back to the Soviet Union or to specified territories in China. Soviet Jews who were already present in Afghanistan with the intent to flee further south were detained in Kabul, and all Soviet Jews who were apprehended at the border were immediately deported. All Soviet citizens, including these Bukharan Jews, were suspected by both the Afghan and British government officials of conducting espionage with the intention to disseminate Bolshevik propaganda.

From September 1933, many of these ex-Soviet Jewish refugees in northern Afghanistan were forcibly relocated to major cities such as Kabul and Herat, but continued to live in under restrictions on work and trade. Whilst it has been claimed that the November 1933 assassination of Mohammad Nadir Shah made the situation worse, this is likely to have had only limited impact. In 1935, the Jewish Telegraph Agency reported that "Ghetto rules" had been imposed on Afghan Jews, requiring them to wear particular clothes, that Jewish women stay out of markets, that no Jews live within certain distances of mosques and that Jews did not ride horses.

From 1935 to 1941, under Prime Minister Mohammad Hashim Khan (uncle of the King) Germany was the most influential country in Afghanistan. The Nazis regarded the Afghans (like the Iranians) as Aryans. In 1938, it was reported that Jews were only allowed to work as shoe-polishers.

Contact with Afghanistan was difficult at this time and with many Jews facing persecution around the world, reports reached the outside world after a delay and were rarely researched thoroughly. Jews were allowed to emigrate in 1951 and most moved to Israel and the United States. By 1969, some 300 remained, and most of these left after the Soviet invasion of 1979, leaving 10 Afghan Jews in 1996, most of them in Kabul. As of 2007, more than 10,000 Jews of Afghan descent were living in Israel and over 200 families of Afghan Jews lived in New York City.

==== Evacuation of the last Afghan Jew ====
In 2001 it was reported that two Jews were left in Afghanistan, Ishaq Levin and Zablon Simintov, and that they did not talk to each other. Levin died in 2005, leaving Simintov as the last Jew living in Afghanistan. Simintov left on 7 September 2021, leaving no known Jews in the country.

=== Malaysia ===
Penang was historically home to a Jewish community of Baghdadi origin that dated back to colonial times. Much of this community emigrated overseas in the decades following World War II, and the last Jewish resident of Penang died in 2011, making this community extinct.

=== Pakistan ===
At the time of Pakistani independence in 1947, some 1,300 Jews remained in Karachi, many of them Bene Israel Jews, observing Sephardic Jewish rites. A small Ashkenazi population was also present in the city. Some Karachi streets still bear names that hark back to a time when the Jewish community was more prominent; such as Ashkenazi Street, Abraham Reuben Street (named after the former member of the Karachi Municipal Corporation), Ibn Gabirol Street, and Moses Ibn Ezra Street—although some streets have been renamed, they are still locally referred to by their original names. Bani Israel Graveyard - a small Jewish cemetery - still exists in the vast Mewa Shah Graveyard near the shrine of a Sufi saint.

The neighbourhood of Baghdadi in Lyari Town is named for the Baghdadi Jews who once lived there. A community of Bukharan Jews was also found in the city of Peshawar, where many buildings in the old city feature a Star of David as exterior decor as a sign of the Hebrew origins of its owners. Members of the community settled in the city as merchants as early as the 17th century, although the bulk arrived as refugees fleeing the advance of the Russian Empire into Bukhara, and later the Russian Revolution in 1917. Today, there are virtually no Jewish communities remaining in Karachi or Peshawar.

The exodus of Jews from Pakistan to Bombay and other cities in India came just prior to the creation of Israel in 1948, when anti-Israeli sentiments rose. By 1953, fewer than 500 Jews were reported to reside in all of Pakistan. Anti-Israeli sentiment and violence often flared during ensuing conflicts in the Middle East, resulting in a further movement of Jews out of Pakistan. Presently, a large number of Jews from Karachi live in the city of Ramla in Israel.

=== Sudan ===
The Jewish community in Sudan was concentrated in the capital Khartoum, and had been established in the late 19th century. At its peak between 1930 and 1950, the community had about 800 to 1,000 members, mainly Jews of Sephardi and Mizrahi backgrounds from North Africa, Syria, and Iraq, though some came from Europe in the 1930s. The community had constructed a synagogue a club at its peak. Between 1948 and 1956, some members of the community left the country. Following independence in 1956 hostility against the Jewish community began to grow, and from 1957 many Sudanese Jews began to leave for Israel, the United States, and Europe, particularly the UK and Switzerland. By the early 1960s the Sudanese Jewish community had been greatly depleted.

In 1967, anti-semitic attacks began to appear in Sudanese newspapers following the Six-Day War, advocating the torture and murder of prominent Jewish community leaders, and there was a mass arrest of Jewish men. Jewish emigration intensified as a result. The last Jews of Sudan left the country in the early 1970s. About 500 Sudanese Jews went to Israel and the rest to Europe and the US.

=== Bangladesh ===
The Jewish population in East Bengal was 200 at the time of the Partition of India in 1947. They included a Baghdadi Jewish merchant community that settled in Dhaka during the 17th century. A prominent Jew in East Pakistan was Mordecai Cohen, who was a Bengali and English newsreader on East Pakistan Television. By the late 1960s, much of the Jewish community had left for Calcutta.

== Table of the Jewish population in Muslim countries ==
In 1948, there were between 758,000 and 881,000 Jews (see table below) living in communities throughout the Arab world. Today, there are fewer than 8,600. In some Arab states, such as Libya, which was about 3% Jewish, the Jewish community no longer exists; in other Arab countries, only a few dozen to a few hundred Jews remain.

Jewish Population by country: 1948, 1972 and recent times
Country or territory	1948 Jewish population	1972 Jewish population	Recent estimates
Morocco	250,000–265,000	31,000	2,100 (2019)
Algeria	140,000	1,000	50–200 (2021)
Tunisia	50,000–105,000	8,000	1,000 (2019)
Libya	35,000–38,000	50	0 (2014)
North Africa Total	~500,000	~40,000	~3,000
Iraq	135,000–140,000	500	3 (2025)
Egypt	75,000–80,000	500	3 (2024)
Yemen and Aden	53,000–63,000	500	50 (2016)
Syria	15,000–30,000	4,000	6 (2024)
Lebanon	5,000–20,000	2,000	100 (2012)
Bahrain	550–600		36 (2007)
Sudan	350		0
Middle East (excluding Palestine/Israel) Total	~300000	~7,500	~200
Afghanistan	5,000	500	0 (2021)
Bangladesh	Unknown		75–100 (2012)
Iran	65,232 (1956)	62,258 (1976) - 80000	9,000–20,000 (2022)
Pakistan	2,000–2,500	250	>900 (2017)
Turkey	80,000	30,000	12,000–16,000 (2022)
Non-Arab Muslim Countries Total	~150,000	~100,000	~24,000

== Absorption ==
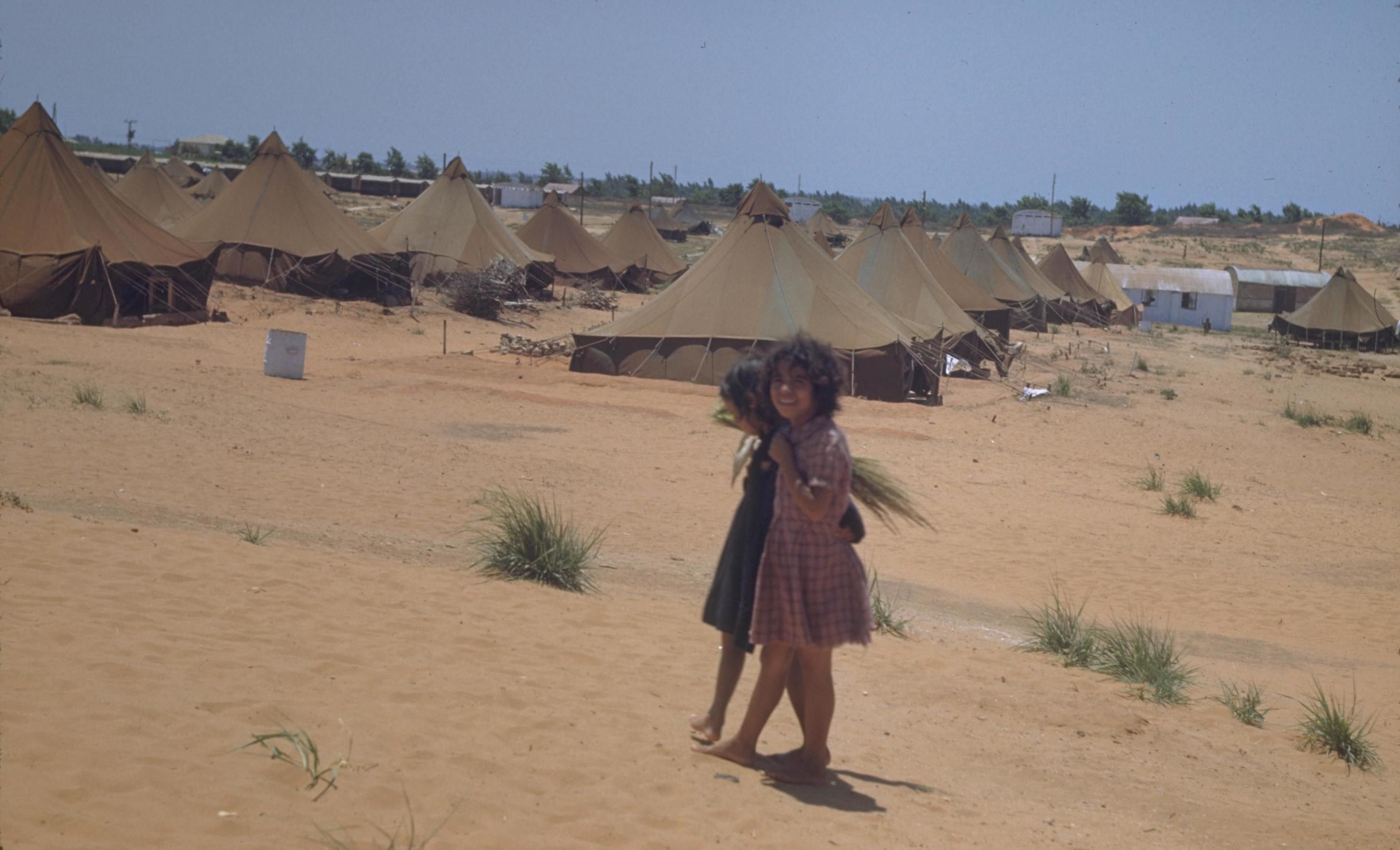
Yemenite Jewish refugee children in front of Bet Lid camp. Israel, 1950

Of the 900,000 Jewish emigrants, around 650,000 emigrated to Israel, and 235,000 to France. The remainder went to other countries in Europe as well as to the Americas. About two thirds of the exodus was from the North Africa region, of which Morocco's Jews went mostly to Israel, Algeria's Jews went mostly to France, and Tunisia's Jews departed for both countries.

=== Israel ===
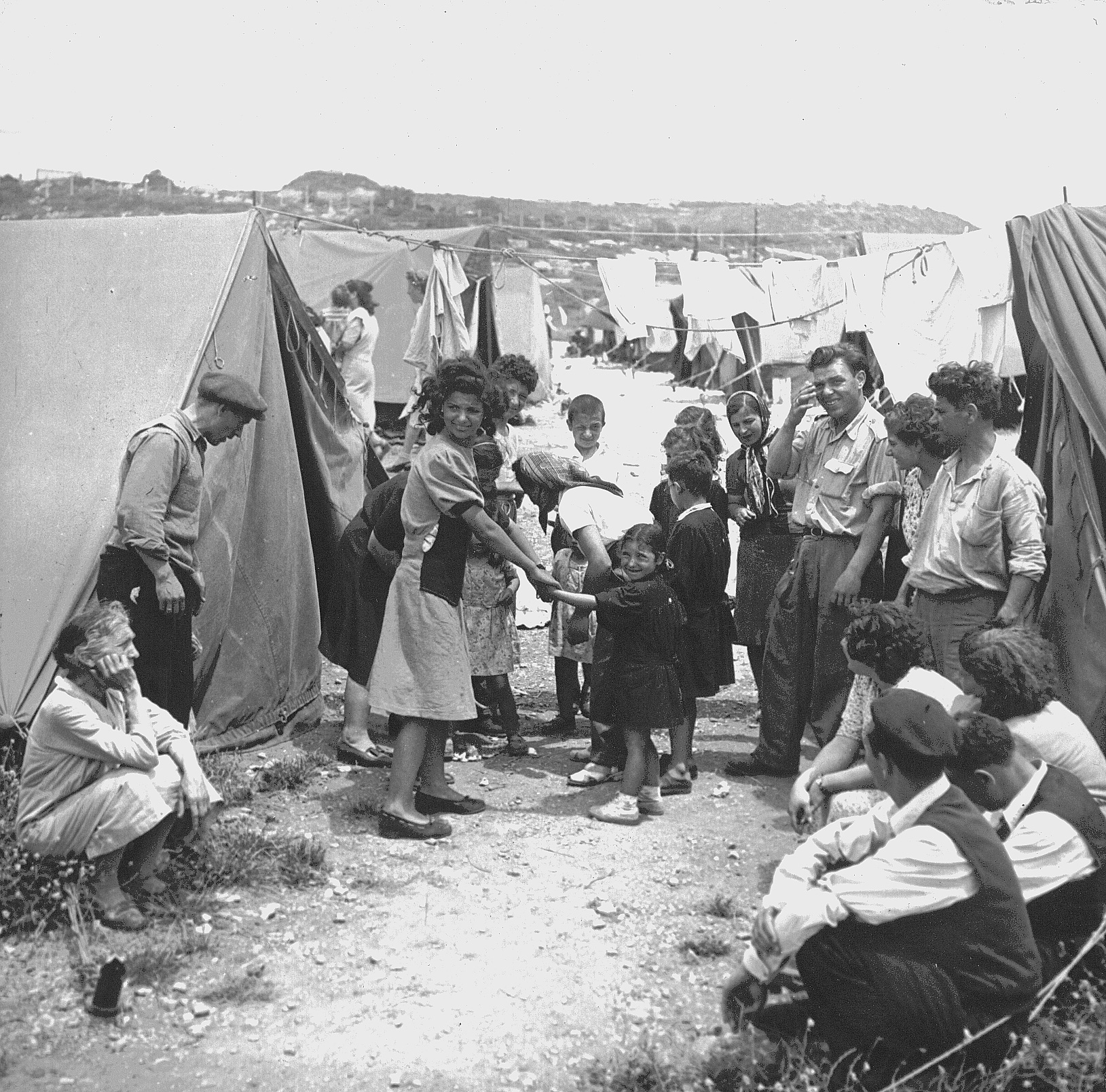
Jewish refugees at a Ma'abarot transit camp, 1950

The majority of Jews in Arab countries eventually immigrated to the modern State of Israel. Hundreds of thousands of Jews were temporarily settled in the numerous immigrant camps throughout the country. Those were later transformed into ma'abarot (transit camps), where tin dwellings were provided to house up to 220,000 residents. The ma'abarot existed until 1963. The population of transition camps was gradually absorbed and integrated into Israeli society. Many of the North African and Middle-Eastern Jews had a hard time adjusting to the new dominant culture, change of lifestyle and there were claims of discrimination.

=== France ===
France was a major destination. About 50% (300,000 people) of modern French Jews have roots from North Africa. In total, it is estimated that between 1956 and 1967, about 235,000 North African Jews from Algeria, Tunisia and Morocco immigrated to France due to the decline of the French Empire and following the Six-Day War.

=== United States ===
The United States was a destination of many Egyptian, Lebanese and Syrian Jews.

== Advocacy groups ==
Advocacy groups acting on behalf of Jews from Arab countries include:

- World Organization of Jews from Arab Countries (WOJAC) seeks to secure rights and redress for Jews from Arab countries who suffered as a result of the Arab–Israeli conflict.
- Justice for Jews from Arab Countries
- JIMENA (Jews Indigenous to the Middle East and North Africa) publicizes the history and plight of the 850,000 Jews indigenous to the Middle East and North Africa who were forced to leave their homes and abandon their property, who were stripped of their citizenship
- HARIF (UK Association of Jews from the Middle East and North Africa) promotes the history and heritage of Jews from the Arab and Muslim world
- Historical Society of the Jews from Egypt and International Association of Jews from Egypt
- Babylonian Jewry Heritage Center

WOJAC, JJAC and JIMENA have been active in recent years in presenting their views to various governmental bodies in the US, Canada and UK, among others, as well as appearing before the United Nations Human Rights Council.

== Views on the exodus ==
=== American government ===
In 2003, H.Con.Res. 311 was introduced into the House of Representatives by congresswoman Ileana Ros-Lehtinen. In 2004 simple resolutions H.Res. 838 and S.Res. 325 were issued into the House of Representatives and Senate by Jerrold Nadler and Rick Santorum, respectively. In 2007, simple resolutions H.Res. 185 and S.Res. 85 were issued into the House of Representatives and Senate. The resolutions had been written together with lobbyist group Justice for Jews from Arab Countries, whose founder Stanley Urman described the resolution in 2009 as "perhaps our most significant accomplishment".

The House of Representatives resolution was sponsored by Jerrold Nadler, who followed the resolutions in 2012 with House Bill H.R. 6242. The 2007–08 resolutions proposed that any "comprehensive Middle East peace agreement to be credible and enduring, the agreement must address and resolve all outstanding issues relating to the legitimate rights of all refugees, including Jews, Christians and other populations displaced from countries in the Middle East", and encourages President Barack Obama and his administration to mention Jewish and other refugees when mentioning Palestinian refugees at international forums. The 2012 bill, which was moved to committee, proposed to recognize the plight of "850,000 Jewish refugees from Arab countries", as well as other refugees, such as Christians from the Middle East, North Africa, and the Persian Gulf.

Jerrold Nadler explained his view in 2012 that "the suffering and terrible injustices visited upon Jewish refugees in the Middle East needs to be acknowledged. It is simply wrong to recognize the rights of Palestinian refugees without recognizing the rights of nearly 1 million Jewish refugees who suffered terrible outrages at the hands of their former compatriots." Critics have suggested the campaign is simply an anti-Palestinian "tactic", which Michael Fischbach explains as "a tactic to help the Israeli government deflect Palestinian refugee claims in any final Israeli–Palestinian peace deal, claims that include Palestinian refugees' demand for the 'right of return' to their pre-1948 homes in Israel."

=== Israeli government ===
The issue of comparison of the Jewish exodus with the Palestinian exodus was raised by the Israeli Foreign Ministry as early as 1961.

In 2012, a special campaign on behalf of the Jewish refugees from Arab countries was established and gained momentum. The campaign urges the creation of an international fund that would compensate both Jewish and Palestinian Arab refugees, and would document and research the plight of Jewish refugees from Arab countries. In addition, the campaign plans to create a national day of recognition in Israel to remember the 850,000 Jewish refugees from Arab countries, as well as to build a museum that would document their history, cultural heritage, and collect their testimony.

On 21 September 2012, a special event was held at the United Nations to highlight the issue of Jewish refugees from Arab countries. Israeli ambassador Ron Prosor asked the United Nations to "establish a center of documentation and research" that would document the "850,000 untold stories" and "collect the evidence to preserve their history", which he said was ignored for too long. Israeli Deputy Foreign Minister Danny Ayalon said that "We are 64 years late, but we are not too late." Diplomats from approximately two dozen countries and organizations, including the United States, the European Union, Germany, Canada, Spain, and Hungary attended the event. In addition, Jews from Arab countries attended and spoke at the event.

=== Mizrahi Jews ===
Israeli historian Benny Morris wrote that "the experience of discrimination and persecution in the Arab world, and the centuries of subjection and humiliation that preceded 1948 ... [left] a deep dislike, indeed hatred, of that world among [first generation Mizrahim who fled or were expelled] and their descendants."

=== "Jewish Nakba" narrative ===
==== Comparison with the Palestinians' Nakba ====
In response to the Palestinian Nakba narrative, the term "Jewish Nakba" is sometimes used to refer to the exodus of Jews from Arab countries in the years and decades following the creation of the State of Israel. Israeli columnist Ben Dror Yemini, himself a Mizrahi Jew, wrote:

However, there is another Nakba: the Jewish Nakba. During those same years [the 1940s], there was a long line of slaughters, of pogroms, of property confiscation and of deportations against Jews in Islamic countries. This chapter of history has been left in the shadows. The Jewish Nakba was worse than the Palestinian Nakba. The only difference is that the Jews did not turn that Nakba into their founding ethos. To the contrary.

Professor Ada Aharoni, chairman of The World Congress of the Jews from Egypt, argues in an article entitled "What about the Jewish Nakba?" that exposing the truth about the exodus of the Jews from Arab states could facilitate a genuine peace process, since it would enable Palestinians to realize they were not the only ones who suffered, and thus their sense of "victimization and rejectionism" will decline.

Additionally, Canadian MP and international human rights lawyer Irwin Cotler has referred to the "double Nakba". He criticizes the Arab states' rejectionism of the Jewish state, their subsequent invasion to destroy the newly formed nation, and the punishment meted out against their local Jewish populations:

The result was, therefore, a double Nakba: not only of Palestinian-Arab suffering and the creation of a Palestinian refugee problem, but also, with the assault on Israel and on Jews in Arab countries, the creation of a second, much less known, group of refugees—Jewish refugees from Arab countries.

==== Israeli criticism of the Jewish Nakba narrative ====
Iraqi-born Ran Cohen, a former member of the Knesset, said: "I have this to say: I am not a refugee. I came at the behest of Zionism, due to the pull that this land exerts, and due to the idea of redemption. Nobody is going to define me as a refugee." Yemeni-born Yisrael Yeshayahu, former Knesset speaker, Labor Party, stated: "We are not refugees. [Some of us] came to this country before the state was born. We had messianic aspirations." And Iraqi-born Shlomo Hillel, also a former speaker of the Knesset, Labor Party, claimed: "I do not regard the departure of Jews from Arab lands as that of refugees. They came here because they wanted to, as Zionists."

Historian Tom Segev stated: "Deciding to emigrate to Israel was often a very personal decision. It was based on the particular circumstances of the individual's life. They were not all poor, or 'dwellers in dark caves and smoking pits'. Nor were they always subject to persecution, repression or discrimination in their native lands. They emigrated for a variety of reasons, depending on the country, the time, the community, and the person."

Iraqi-born Israeli historian Avi Shlaim, speaking of the wave of Iraqi Jewish migration to Israel, concludes that, even though Iraqi Jews were "victims of the Israeli-Arab conflict", Iraqi Jews are not refugees, saying "nobody expelled us from Iraq, nobody told us that we were unwanted." He restated that case in a review of Martin Gilbert's book, In Ishmael's House.

Yehuda Shenhav has criticized the analogy between Jewish emigration from Arab countries and the Palestinian exodus. He also says "The unfounded, immoral analogy between Palestinian refugees and Mizrahi immigrants needlessly embroils members of these two groups in a dispute, degrades the dignity of many Mizrahi Jews, and harms prospects for genuine Jewish-Arab reconciliation." He has stated that "the campaign's proponents hope their efforts will prevent conferral of what is called a 'right of return' on Palestinians, and reduce the size of the compensation Israel is liable to be asked to pay in exchange for Palestinian property appropriated by the state guardian of 'lost' assets."

Ella Shohat has described the Zionist master narrative of the migration of Jews from Muslim lands to Israel as a discourse in which "European Zionism 'saved' Sephardi Jews from the harsh rule of their Arab 'captors'" and "took them out of 'primitive conditions' of poverty and superstition and ushered them gently into a modern Western society characterized by tolerance, democracy, and 'humane values.'" She cites the impression of Israeli journalist Arye Gelblum in Haaretz in 1949:

This is immigration of a race we have not yet known in the country .... We are dealing with people whose primitivism is at a peak, whose level of knowledge is one of virtually absolute ignorance, and worse, who have little talent for understanding anything intellectual. Generally, they are only slightly better than the general level of the Arabs, Negroes, and Berbers in the same regions. In any case, they are at an even lower level than what we knew with regard to the former Arabs of Eretz Israel ... . These Jews also lack roots in Judaism, as they are totally subordinated to the play of savage and primitive instincts... As with the Africans you will find card games for money, drunkenness and prostitution. Most of them have serious eye, skin and sexual diseases, without mentioning robberies and thefts. Chronic laziness and hatred for work, there is nothing safe about this asocial element... "Aliyat HaNoar" [the official organization dealing with young immigrants] refuses to receive Moroccan children and the Kibbutzim will not hear of their absorption among them.

Israeli historian Yehoshua Porath has rejected the comparison, arguing that while there is a superficial similarity, the ideological and historical significance of the two population movements are entirely different. Porath points out that the immigration of Jews from Arab countries to Israel, expelled or not, was the "fulfilment of a national dream". He also argues that the achievement of this Zionist goal was only made possible through the endeavors of the Jewish Agency's agents, teachers, and instructors working in various Arab countries since the 1930s. Porath contrasts this with the Palestinian Arabs' flight of 1948 as completely different. He describes the outcome of the Palestinian's flight as an "unwanted national calamity" that was accompanied by "unending personal tragedies". The result was "the collapse of the Palestinian community, the fragmentation of a people, and the loss of a country that had in the past been mostly Arabic-speaking and Islamic. "

Alon Liel, a former director-general of the Foreign Ministry says that many Jews escaped from Arab countries, but he does not call them "refugees".

==== Palestinian criticism of the Jewish Nakba narrative ====
On 21 September 2012, at a United Nations conference, the issue of Jewish refugees from Arab countries was criticized by Hamas spokesman, Sami Abu Zuhri, who stated that the Jewish refugees from Arab countries were in fact responsible for the Palestinian displacement and that "those Jews are criminals rather than refugees." In regard to the same conference, Palestinian politician Hanan Ashrawi has argued that Jews from Arab lands are not refugees at all and that Israel is using their claims in order to counterbalance to those of Palestinian refugees against it. Ashrawi said that "If Israel is their homeland, then they are not 'refugees'; they are emigrants who returned either voluntarily or due to a political decision."

== Property losses and compensation ==
In Libya, Iraq and Egypt many Jews lost vast portions of their wealth and property as part of the exodus because of severe restrictions on moving their wealth out of the country.

In other countries in North Africa, the situation was more complex. For example, in Morocco emigrants were not allowed to take more than $60 worth of Moroccan currency with them, although generally they were able to sell their property prior to leaving, and some were able to work around the currency restrictions by exchanging cash into jewelry or other portable valuables. This led some scholars to speculate the Moroccan and Algerian Jewish populations, comprising a large percentage of the exodus, on the whole did not suffer large property losses.

Yemeni Jews were usually able to sell what property they possessed prior to departure, although not always at market rates.

=== Estimated financial value ===
Various estimates of the value of property abandoned by the Jewish exodus have been published, with wide variety in the quoted figures from a few billion dollars to hundreds of billions.

The World Organization of Jews from Arab Countries (WOJAC) estimated in 2006, that Jewish property abandoned in Arab countries would be valued at more than $100 billion, later revising their estimate in 2007 to $300 billion. They also estimated Jewish-owned real-estate left behind in Arab lands at 100,000 square kilometers (four times the size of the state of Israel).

The type and extent of linkage between the Jewish exodus from Arab countries and the 1948 Palestinian exodus has also been the source of controversy. Jewish advocacy group JJAC has suggested that there are strong ties between the two processes and that decoupling the two issues is unjust.

Holocaust restitution expert Sidney Zabludoff, writing for the Israeli-advocacy group Jerusalem Center for Public Affairs, suggests that the losses sustained by the Jews who fled Arab countries since 1947 amounts to $700 million at period prices based on an estimated per capita wealth of $700 multiplied by one million refugees, equating to $6 billion today, assuming that the entire exodus left all of their wealth behind.

=== Israeli position ===
The official position of the Israeli government is that Jews from Arab countries are considered refugees, and it considers their rights to property left in countries of origin as valid and existent.

In 2008, the Orthodox Sephardi party, Shas, announced its intention to seek compensation for Jewish refugees from Arab states.

In 2009, Israeli lawmakers introduced a bill into the Knesset to make compensation for Jews from Arab and Muslim countries an integral part of any future peace negotiations by requiring compensation on behalf of current Jewish Israeli citizens, who were expelled from Arab countries after Israel was established in 1948 and leaving behind a significant amount of valuable property. In February 2010, the bill passed its first reading. The bill was sponsored by MK Nissim Ze'ev (Shas) and follows a resolution passed in the United States House of Representatives in 2008, calling for refugee recognition to be extended to Jews and Christians similar to that extended to Palestinians in the course of Middle East peace talks.

== Films and documentaries ==
- I Miss the Sun (1984), USA, produced and directed by Mary Halawani. Profile of Halawani's grandmother, Rosette Hakim. A prominent Egyptian-Jewish family, the Halawanis left Egypt in 1959. Rosette, the family matriarch, chose to remain in Egypt until every member of the large family was free to leave.
- The Dhimmis: To Be a Jew in Arab Lands (1987), director Baruch Gitlis and David Goldstein a producer. Presents a history of Jews in the Middle East.
- The Forgotten Refugees (2005) is a documentary film by The David Project, describing the events of the Jewish exodus from Arab and Muslim countries
- The Silent Exodus (2004) by Pierre Rehov. Selected at the International Human Rights Film Festival of Paris (2004) and presented at the UN Geneva Human Rights Annual Convention (2004).
- The Last Jews of Libya (2007) by Vivienne Roumani-Denn. Describes how European colonialism, Italian fascism and the rise of Arab nationalism contributed to the disappearance of Libya's Sephardic Jewish community.
- "From Babylonia To Beverly Hills: The Exodus of Iran's Jews" Documentary.
- Goodbye Mothers. A Moroccan film inspired by the sinking of the Egoz

== Memorialization in Israel ==
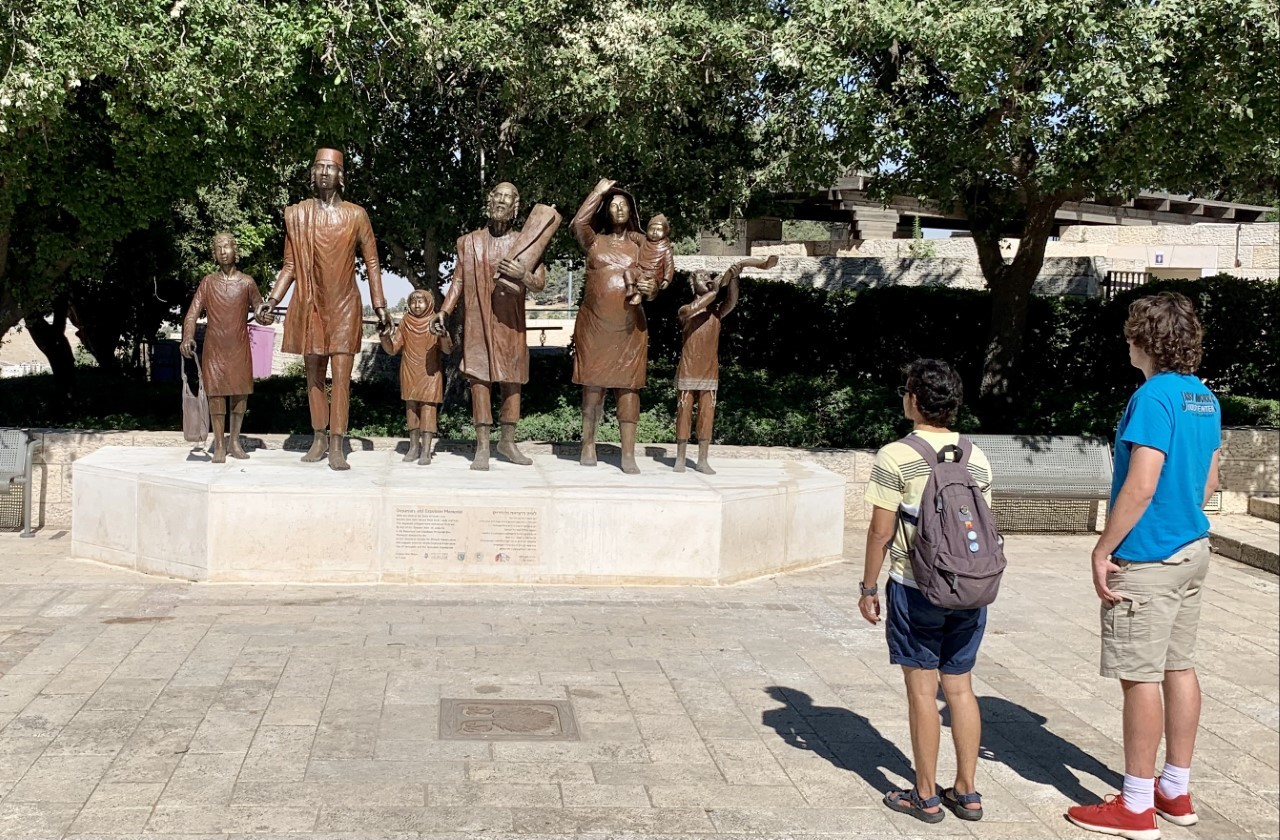
Jewish Departure and Expulsion Memorial from Arab Lands and Iran on the Sherover Promenade, Jerusalem

9 May 2021, the first physical memorialization in Israel of the Departure and Expulsion of Jews from Arab Lands and Iran was placed on the Sherover Promenade in Jerusalem. It is titled the Departure and Expulsion Memorial following the Knesset law for the annual recognition of the Jewish experience held annually on 30 November.

The text on the Memorial reads;

With the birth of the State of Israel, over 850,000
Jews were forced from Arab Lands and Iran.
The desperate refugees were welcomed by Israel.

By Act of the Knesset: 30 Nov, annually, is the
Departure and Expulsion Memorial Day.
Memorial donated by the Jewish American Society for Historic Preservation,
With support from the World Sephardi Federation, City of Jerusalem and the Jerusalem Foundation

The sculpture is the interpretive work of Sam Philipe, a fifth-generation Jerusalemite.

== See also ==
- Day to Mark the Departure and Expulsion of Jews from the Arab Countries and Iran
- Arab Jews, History of the Jews under Muslim rule
- Jewish population by country
  - Historical Jewish population comparisons
- Jews outside Europe under Axis occupation
- 1948 Palestinian expulsion and flight
- Ma'abarot, Development town, Refugee camp
- After Saturday comes Sunday, Christian emigration, Muhajir (Muslim exodus)
- Jewish refugees, Palestinian refugees, Sahrawi refugees, Greek refugees, Kurdish refugees
- Cicurel family
- Pallache family
- Palestinian expulsion from Kuwait
