= The Forgotten Refugees =

2005 film

- DVD cover art
- Directed by: Michael Grynszpan
- Starring: Irwin Cotler; Mordechai Ben-Porat; Raphael Israeli; Gina Waldman; Linda Abdul Aziz Menuhin
- Production companies: The David Project; IsraTV
- Release date: 2005
- Running time: 49 minutes
- Country: Israel
- Language: English

The Forgotten Refugees is a 2005 documentary film directed by Michael Grynszpan and produced by The David Project and IsraTV with Ralph Avi Goldwasser as executive producer, that recounts the history of Jewish communities of the Middle East and North Africa and their demise in the face of persecutions following the creation of the modern State of Israel in 1948.

== Summary ==
The documentary explores the history, culture, and exodus of Middle Eastern and North African Jewish communities in the second half of the 20th century. Using extensive testimony of refugees from Egypt, Yemen, Libya, Iraq, and Morocco, the film weaves personal stories with dramatic archival footage of rescue missions, historic images of exodus and resettlement, and analyses by contemporary scholars to tell the story of how and why the Jewish population in the Middle East and North Africa declined from one million in 1945 to several thousand today.

== Interviewees ==
Personalities interviewed in the film include:

- Irwin Cotler, Canadian member of parliament and international human rights lawyer
- Mordechai Ben-Porat, Iraqi Jew and facilitator of the mass emigration of Iraqi Jews between 1949 and 1951
- Gina Waldman, Libyan Jew and current head of JIMENA (Jews Indigenous to the Middle East and North Africa)
- Raphael Israeli, Moroccan Jew and Israeli academic
- Linda Abdul Aziz Menuhin - an Iraqi Jew who is also the subject of the 2013 documentary Shadow in Baghdad.

== Releases ==
Shown at multiple Jewish film festivals in the US and worldwide and on public television networks, the film was also screened at the second annual UN panel on Jewish refugees from Arab countries. It was also shown at a hearing held by the US Congressional Human Rights Caucus which heard testimonies on the issue of Jewish refugees from Arab countries.

In 2012, the rights to the film were acquired by JIMENA (Jews Indigenous to the Middle East and North Africa), an organization working for recognition of the "heritage and history of the 850,000 indigenous Jewish refugees from the Middle East and North Africa."

== Recognition ==
=== Reception ===
Reviewing the film for the Judaism quarterly, Alanna Cooper remarked that it provides a striking contrast between Jews who see themselves as refugees and identify as Arab, and those who have fully assimilated into the Israeli nation.

=== Awards and nominations ===
The Forgotten Refugees won the "Best Documentary Film" at the 2007 Marbella Film Festival.

In 2006, the film won "Best Featured Documentary" at the Warsaw Jewish Film Festival.

== See also ==
- Jewish exodus from Arab lands
- Islam and antisemitism
- Arabs and antisemitism
