= World Organization of Jews from Arab Countries =

International advocacy organization representing Jewish refugees from Arab states

World Organization of Jews from Arab Countries (WOJAC) was an international advocacy organization, created in 1975, representing Jewish refugees from Arab countries. The World Organization of Jews from Arab Countries was created to make certain that any "just settlement of the refugee problem" recognizes those Jews who were forced to flee from lands where they had lived for centuries.

The WOJAC functioned for approximately 25 years (from 1975 until 1999). WOJAC's aspiration was to operate in the national arena, to counterbalance the claims of the Palestinian leadership on the right to the land and on the refugee question.

The monograph "The Case of the Jews from Arab Countries: A Neglected Issue, published by WOJAC, 1975" by Maurice M. Roumani was used in preparation of the first International conference on the subject organized by WOJAC in 1975 in Paris. The English version of the monograph subsequently appeared in four editions, the last was 1983, and translated into French and Spanish with parts of it into Hebrew, in 1977.

== See also ==
- Jews Indigenous to the Middle East and North Africa (JIMENA)
- Justice for Jews from Arab Countries (JJAC)
- Historical Jewish population comparisons
- Arab Jews
