= Henry Alan Green =

Henry Alan Green is a professor of religious studies at the University of Miami in Miami, Florida, United States. He has taught there since 1984. He is the published author or co-author of four books and numerous articles, and has received recognition for his work on documenting the exodus of Jews from Arab countries after the Second World War.

== Early life and education ==
Henry Alan Green received his B.A. in Sociology from Carleton University in 1970. He then completed post-baccalaureate work at the Hebrew University of Jerusalem from 1970-1971, before returning to Carleton University for his M.A. in Sociology in 1973. Following that, he completed postgraduate work at the University of Oxford (1974) and the École pratique des hautes études (1975-1976) in Religion and Sociology, before completing his Ph.D. in Divinity at St. Andrew's University in 1982, with a dissertation focused on gnosticism in early Christianity, and its Jewish roots.

== Career ==
Green has been a professor at the University of Miami since 1984. He was director of the Judaic Studies Program at the University of Miami from its inception in 1984 until 2000, and introduced a Sephardic Studies concentration during his tenure.

Green served as a research associate at the Hebrew University of Jerusalem in Israel from 1977 to 1979. In Canada, he was visiting assistant professor at the University of Alberta in Edmonton from 1979 to 1980 and visiting assistant professor and post-doctoral fellow at Carleton University in Ottawa from 1981 to 1983. He also served as a visiting assistant professor in the Department of Classics and Religion at Dickinson College in Carlisle, Pennsylvania, from 1983 to 1984.

Green was a Skirball Fellow at the University of Oxford in 1991, served as a University College fellow at the University of Toronto from 2001 to 2002, and also served as a fellow at the Centre for Contemporary Jewry, located in the Hebrew University of Jerusalem, in 2009.

== Academic projects ==
=== HIPPY USA ===
During his tenure as a research associate at the Hebrew University of Jerusalem's School of Education from 1977-1979, Green was heavily involved in research examining how to strengthen children's early cognitive skills and parental bonds. This research evolved into an early childhood education program, HIPPY (Home Instruction for Parents of Preschool Youngsters), an evidence-based program that strengthens families and communities by helping parents prepare their children for school success. HIPPY was mentioned in Hillary Clinton's book It Takes a Village as one of the successful organizations helping to empower parents and increase children's cognitive skills and school readiness across the United States, and former President Clinton spoke very highly of HIPPY and Secretary of State Clinton's role in its growth during the 2016 Democratic National Convention. Green was instrumental in exporting the HIPPY model from Israel to the United States and Canada, and served as the national chair of HIPPY USA's Board of Trustees from 2000 to 2003, receiving acknowledgment for his work from Secretary of State Clinton during an awards dinner in 2014. He currently sits on the HIPPY Florida Advisory Committee, and is a former Vice Chair of the Board of Directors in HIPPY Canada.

=== Sephardi Voices ===
Green is very active as a voice for Sephardi Jews, both in the United States and abroad. He testified before the Congressional Human Rights Caucus in Washington, D.C. in 2007, on the topic of truth, justice, and reconciliation for Jewish refugees from Arab countries, and serves on a number of boards for Sephardi-related organizations. The Sephardi Voices Project is the first comprehensive digital archive that documents and preserves the life stories of Jews who lived in Islamic lands with videos, audio, and photographs. Green's most recent book, SEPHARDI VOICES: The Untold Expulsion of Jews from Arab Lands is the culmination of this project and Green's work on Sephardi Jews. Additionally, he has been a member of the Executive Committee for Justice for Jews from Arab Countries (JJAC) since 2012, and has been a member of the Academic Advisory Board of the American Sephardi Federation since 2008

Green is also the founder and executive director of Sephardi Voices, an international NGO formed in 2009 and dedicated to collecting the testimonies of the "forgotten exodus" of Jews from Arab countries. Sephardi Voices has collected hundreds of audio-visual interviews with Jewish migrants, refugees, and displaced persons from North Africa, Iran, and the Middle East, and its short film What We Left Behind premiered at numerous Jewish film festivals to significant acclaim. His work with Sephardi Voices has garnered recognition from a variety of Jewish publications and various organizations, and he has presented at dozens of conferences on the subjects of oral life-stories, migration and identity, and the importance of including Sephardi history post-colonialism into the narrative of Jewish peoplehood.

=== Jews in Florida ===
Green is a noted scholar on the subject of American Sephardi and Mizrahi, the sociology of Judaism, and South Florida Jewry. He has published several articles on the subject of Jewish demographics in South Florida, and wrote the biography of Rabbi Leon Kronish, the spiritual leader of Temple Beth Sholom from 1944-1984, and a notable figure both among South Florida Jewry and in American Reform Judaism in general.

He is the founding director of "MOSAIC: Jewish life in Florida", a project conceived in 1985. The project morphed into a traveling exhibit, with documents and artifacts of Floridian Jewish life sourced by volunteers and coordinators from all across the state, with an accompanying exhibit guidebook. After a national tour that ended in 1995, MOSAIC became the core exhibit of the newly minted Jewish Museum of Florida, today a project of Florida International University, and the Museum is housed out of the first synagogue ever built on Miami Beach (1929). Congresswoman Ileana Ros-Lehtinen recently toured the Museum with Green, and later applauded the Museum's work in a session of the House of Representatives.

=== Judaism and early Christianity ===
Green is a noted scholar on the sociological origins of gnosticism, and its reliance on Judaism as a foundational element. He has written extensively on the subject, and the book based on his dissertation is viewed as the most significant contribution to the sociological origins of gnosticism, three decades after its publication.

== Publications ==
=== Books ===
- Henry Alan Green, The Economic and Social Origins of Gnosticism, Scholars Press, Atlanta, 1985, pp. 304.
- Henry Alan Green and Marcia Zerivitz, MOSAIC: Jewish Life in Florida, MOSAIC, Inc./University Presses of Florida, Miami and Gainesville, 1991, pp. 80. Chosen as Alternate Selection by the Jewish Book Club.
- Henry Alan Green, Gesher VaKesher—Bridges and Bonds: The Life of Leon Kronish, South Florida Studies in the History of Judaism, Scholars Press, 1995, pp. 287.
- Henry Green and Denise Necoechea, HIPPY Health Curriculum, University of South Florida, Tampa, 2006, 138 pages; 2010, 117 pages.
- Henry Green and Denise Necoechea, Plan De Estudio De La Salud Del Programa HIPPY (Spanish translation), University of South Florida, Tampa, 2010, 117 pages.
- Henry Green and Richard Stursberg, Sephardi Voices: The Untold Expulsion of Jews from Arab Lands, Figure 1, Vancouver, 2021, 156 pages. [Selected as the 4th most popular review of 2022 by the Jewish Book Council.]
- Henry Green and Paul George, Jewish Miami Beach, Arcadia, Charleston, SC, 2023 (forthcoming, autumn).
- Henry Alan Green, The Forgotten Exodus of Arab Jews, (in process) – Mango Press
