= Leon Benzaquen =

Moroccan politician and physician

Dr. Leon Benzaquen

Leon Benzaquen (Tangier, 1902 – Casablanca, August 1977) was a Moroccan doctor who became the personal doctor for King Mohammed V of Morocco, and the first Moroccan Jewish minister after Morocco gained independence in 1956, in its first independent government. He was first appointed as telegraph and communications minister and later minister of health, a post Benzaquen kept until 1958.

When Morocco received its independence in 1956, the Jewish community held quite a few respectable political positions, including three parliamentarian seats and one cabinet post as mail and telegraph minister. Upon receiving its independence in 1956, the Sultan insisted upon the appointment of Leon Benzaquen, while the Jewish community was unable to reach a consensus on whom to send as a representative to the cabinet. coincident with his appointment Benzaquen expressed his favor opinion on the Jewish right to emigrate, pending it will not include pressure or propaganda. The problem at the time was the objection of various forces in Morocco to a mass Jewish emigration that will play into the hands of the Jewish Agency for Israel, however the right to emigrate was in fact recognized on an individual basis. He also claimed that Morocco and Tunisia may play a role in mediating between the Arab states and Israel, and that despite not being able to express their opinion in public, the Moroccan leaders do not sense any sympathy towards Gamal Abdel Nasser or other Arab dictators in the middle east.

The prevailing view is that Benzaquen remained neutral during the Morocco's struggle for independence, due to an internal Jewish struggle among Jewish-Moroccan modernists, graduates of AIU, Zionists, and traditionalists (In 1944, he refused to sign the first Independence Manifesto of the "Istiqlal" group, who opposed the occupation but also the kingdom).

Despite this gesture of good will towards the Jewish-Moroccan community, in appointing Leon Benzaquen to a ministerial post, Benzaquen did not survive in occupying the post when there was a government reshuffle for the first time in Morocco since it received its independence, and Jews in Morocco were no longer appointed to the cabinet (until the '80s).
