= Push and pull factors in migration =

Concept in demographics

Push and pull factors in migration according to Everett S. Lee (1917–2007) are categories that demographers use to analyze human migration from former areas to new host locations. Lee's model divides factors causing migrations into two groups of factors: push and pull. Push factors are things that are unfavourable about the home area that one lives in, and pull factors are things that attract one to another host area.

Sociology professor Hein de Haas has criticized the push-pull model for its inability to explain real world migration patterns.

== See also ==
- Human migration
- Return migration
- Urbanization
