= Justice for Jews from Arab Countries =

American political advocacy organization

Justice for Jews from Arab Countries (JJAC) is a political advocacy organization founded in New York in 2002, which was formed by the Conference of Presidents, the World Jewish Congress, the American Sephardi Federation, and the World Organization of Jews from Arab Countries. Today, JJAC works with the American Jewish Committee, American Jewish Congress, Jewish Council for Public Affairs, the World Sephardic Congress.

== Mission statement ==
Its mission statement is:

- a) To represent the interests of Jews from Arab countries and Iran;
- b) To recognize the legacy of Jewish refugees from Arab countries and Iran;
- c) To register and record personal testimonies of Jews from Arab countries and Iran, in order to preserve their history and heritage;
- d) To serve as a clearing house of information and documentation on Jewish refugees from Arab countries and Iran; and
- e) To conduct public education programs that provide historical perspective, in the pursuit of truth, justice and reconciliation.

== Achievements ==
According to founder Stanley Urman in 2009, "Perhaps our most significant accomplishment was the adoption in April 2008 by the United States Congress of Resolution 185, which granted the first-ever recognition of Jewish refugees from the Arab countries. This now requires US diplomats in all Middle East negotiations to refer to a quote of what the resolution calls "multiple population of refugees" with a specific injunction that hands forth any specific reference and "any specific reference to the Palestinian refugees must be matched by an explicit reference to Jewish refugees"... our mandate is to follow that lead. Any explicit reference to Palestinians should be followed by explicit reference to Jewish refugees."

JJAC and the World Organization of Jews from Arab Countries advocated for the establishment in 2014 of November 30 in Israel as the national day of commemoration for the 850,000 Jews who were expelled or fled from Arab countries following the establishment of the State of Israel.

According to a six-year study by JJAC released in 2024, the value of property confiscated from Syria's Jews exceeds $10 billion. The study's research methodology used evidence of Jewish economic status, written documentation, interviews with community leaders and experts, and analysis of previous evaluations. The study was part of a broader research initiative, with findings on 10 additional Arab countries scheduled for later release.

Critics have suggested that JJAC's resolution was "a tactic to help the Israeli government deflect Palestinian refugee claims in any final Israeli-Palestinian peace deal, claims that include Palestinian refugees' demand for the "right of return" to their pre-1948 homes in Israel."

== See also ==
- Jewish refugees
- Jewish exodus from Arab and Muslim countries
- Arab Jews
