= Jews Indigenous to the Middle East and North Africa =

Nonprofit organization

Jews Indigenous to the Middle East and North Africa (JIMENA) is a non-profit organization headquartered in San Francisco, California, that is dedicated to the preservation of Mizrahi and Sephardi culture and history, and seeks to educate the public and advocate for Jewish refugees from the Middle East.

== Historical background ==
The Jewish exodus from Arab and Muslim lands in the 20th century was a result of the expulsion and mass departure primarily of Sephardi and Mizrahi background from Arab and Islamic countries. The migration started in the late 19th century, but accelerated after the 1948 Arab–Israeli War. According to official Arab statistics, 856,000 Jews left their homes in Arab countries from 1948 until the early 1970s. Some 600,000 resettled in Israel, leaving behind property valued today at more than $300 billion. Jewish-owned real-estate left behind in Arab lands has been estimated at 100,000 square kilometers (four times the size of the State of Israel). Thus, of the nearly 900,000 Jewish refugees from Arab lands, approximately 600,000 were absorbed by Israel; the remainder went to Europe and the Americas.

== History ==
Joe Wahed was the co-founder of JIMENA. Current board members include noted human rights advocate Gina Waldman, executive film producer and co-founder of the David Project Ralph Avi Goldwasser, Varda Rabin (wife of the noted Jewish philanthropist Irving Rabin), and Professor Henry Green of the University of Miami, director of the Sephardi Voices project.

== Advocacy ==
JIMENA played a key role in the unanimous passage of House Resolution 185 by the U.S. Foreign Affairs Committee on Wednesday, February 27, 2008. This resolution urges the President to ensure that when refugees from the Middle East are discussed in international forums, any reference to Palestinian refugees be matched by a similarly explicit reference to Jewish and other refugee populations.

In December 2007 JIMENA briefed Iraqi-born Ruth Pearl, mother of slain journalist Daniel Pearl, before her meeting with the President at the Hanukka White House party. She informed President Bush, for the first time ever, of the plight of the 850,000 Jewish refugees from the Middle East and North Africa. During the President's recent visit to Israel, he was reported to have mentioned the importance of including the Jewish refugees in future negotiations about refugees of the Middle East.

In March 2008, JIMENA testified at the United Nations Human Rights Council in Geneva, Switzerland, on behalf of Jewish refugees from the Middle East and North Africa.

In January 2019, JIMENA issued a "Sephardic and Mizrahi Communal Response" to Jewish Voice for Peace. JIMENA criticized JVP's anti-Zionism and invocation of Mizrahi and Sephardi history to critique the State of Israel.

In 2021, JIMENA lobbied the California Department of Education to include a lesson titled, “Antisemitism and Middle Eastern Jewish Americans,” into their Ethnic Studies Model Curriculum. This is the first time a state-level department of education has included materials on Sephardic and Mizrahi Jews in a social studies framework.

== Education ==
As part of an international consortium led by Hebrew University and the University of Miami, JIMENA in 2009 began collecting testimonies and interviews from Jews from Arabic-speaking countries to tell the stories of Jews expelled and persecuted in Arab countries.

In January 2020, JIMENA hosted a conference in San Francisco, California called “Journey to the Mizrah.” The purpose of the conference was to train educators on how to integrate Sephardic scholarship, spirituality, history, and contemporary heritage into classrooms and learning spaces. JIMENA has since expanded the curriculum into a guide for implementation in classroom settings.

Three years later, JIMENA adapted the original Journey to the Mizrah framework into a Sephardi & Mizrahi Education Toolkit with a stated mission as a, “compendium of recommendations, strategies, and resources to help educators learn about Sephardi and Mizrahi heritage and shape inclusive school environments.”

JIMENA offered educational programming during the COVID-19 pandemic, such as virtual opportunities to explore the Jewish history of Kurdistan, Tunisia, Morocco, and Yemen. During this time, the nonprofit also inaugurated its Sephardic Leaders Fellowship with support from the Jewish Community Federation and the Jewish Community Response and Impact Fund.

In 2023, JIMENA published Distinctions Journal, an online quarterly journal highlighting voices of Sephardi and Mizrahi scholars, researchers, artists, and activists.

== See also ==
- Arab–Israeli conflict
- Antisemitism in the Arab world
- History of the Jews under Muslim rule
- Islam and antisemitism
- Jewish population
- Jewish refugees
- Jews outside Europe under Axis occupation
- Arab Jews
- Mizrahi Jews
