= Israel–Morocco relations =

- Morocco: Israel

Diplomatic mission
- Embassy of Morocco, Tel Aviv (upgrading liaison office): Embassy of Israel, Rabat (under construction)

The State of Israel and the Kingdom of Morocco formally established diplomatic relations in 2020, when both sides signed the Israel–Morocco normalization agreement in light of the Abraham Accords. While official ties had previously not existed due to the Arab–Israeli conflict, the two countries maintained a secretive bilateral relationship on a number of fronts following the 1948 Arab–Israeli War. For many years, Moroccan king Hassan II facilitated a relationship with Israeli authorities, and these ties are considered to have been instrumental in stabilizing Morocco and striking down possible anti-monarchy threats within the country. The Israeli passport is accepted for entry into Morocco, with a visa granted on arrival. With the bilateral normalization agreement in December 2020, Morocco officially recognized Israeli statehood. Almost three years later, in July 2023, Israel officially recognized Moroccan sovereignty over Western Sahara.

In September 2026, the two nations announced that they would upgrade diplomatic ties, exchange ambassadors and re-establish flights between the countries.

== History ==
=== Background ===
The history of Jewish communities in what is now Morocco extends approximately two millennia.

In the early 20th century, Zionism, the movement to establish a Jewish state in Palestine, spread from Europe to Moroccan coastal cities and then spread slowly among Morocco's Jewish communities over the following decades. Only after the establishment of the State of Israel in 1948, however, was there notable Zionist emigration from Morocco. The migration of Moroccan Jews to Israel had significant support from external Zionist organizations, including the Jewish Agency, Mossad Le'Aliyah, and the American Hebrew Immigrant Aid Society (HIAS), and there were a number of initiatives to facilitate this migration, including the Caisse d’Aide aux Immigrants Marocains or Cadima (Hebrew: קדימה, 'forward'; 1949–1956), Operation Yachin (Hebrew: מבצע יכין; 1961–1964), and ha-Misgeret (המסגרת 'The Framework'; 1956–1964). By the end of the 20th century, roughly two thirds of Moroccan Jews migrated to Israel and only a small fraction of the Moroccan Jewish community remained in Morocco.

=== Period between the establishment of the State of Israel and Moroccan independence (1948–1956) ===
==== 1948 Palestine War and the establishment of the State of Israel ====
The global Zionist movement had not been very interested in the Jews of Morocco until the establishment of the State of Israel in Palestine in 1948. Only from then was there significant Zionist emigration from Morocco. From 1947–1949 the Jewish Agency organized emigration, though it was illegal; prospective migrants caught attempting to cross the border into Algeria would be sent back. Clandestine migration through Algeria during the Palestine war led to the 1948 anti-Jewish riots in Oujda and Jerada in June.

Shay Hazkani writes that about 20,000 Moroccan Jews migrated to Israel in 1948–49, and there was a manifested desire to leave Israel and return to Morocco due to Ashkenazi racism, and that this urge was most apparent among the 645–1600 North Africans (most of whom were Moroccan) who fought in the Israeli military in the 1948 Palestine War. Based on their personal letters that were intercepted by the Israeli military postal censorship bureau, 70% of them wanted to return to their country of origin and warned their families not to come to Israel. Among those who weren't in the military, 60% were actively trying to return to their countries and 90% were urging their families not to come to Israel.

==== Cadima and Seleqseya ====
From 1949 to 1956, Cadima, a migration apparatus administered by Jewish Agency and Mossad Le'Aliyah agents sent from Israel, organized the migration of over 60,000 Moroccan Jews to Israel. Jewish emigration increased significantly in the period before Moroccan independence in 1956.

In 1951, Israel applied restrictions the migration of poor Moroccan Jews through a criterion known as seleqṣeya (Hebrew: סלקציה) that included a strict medical examination and privileged healthy young people and families with a breadwinner.

=== Reign of Hassan II (1961–1999) ===
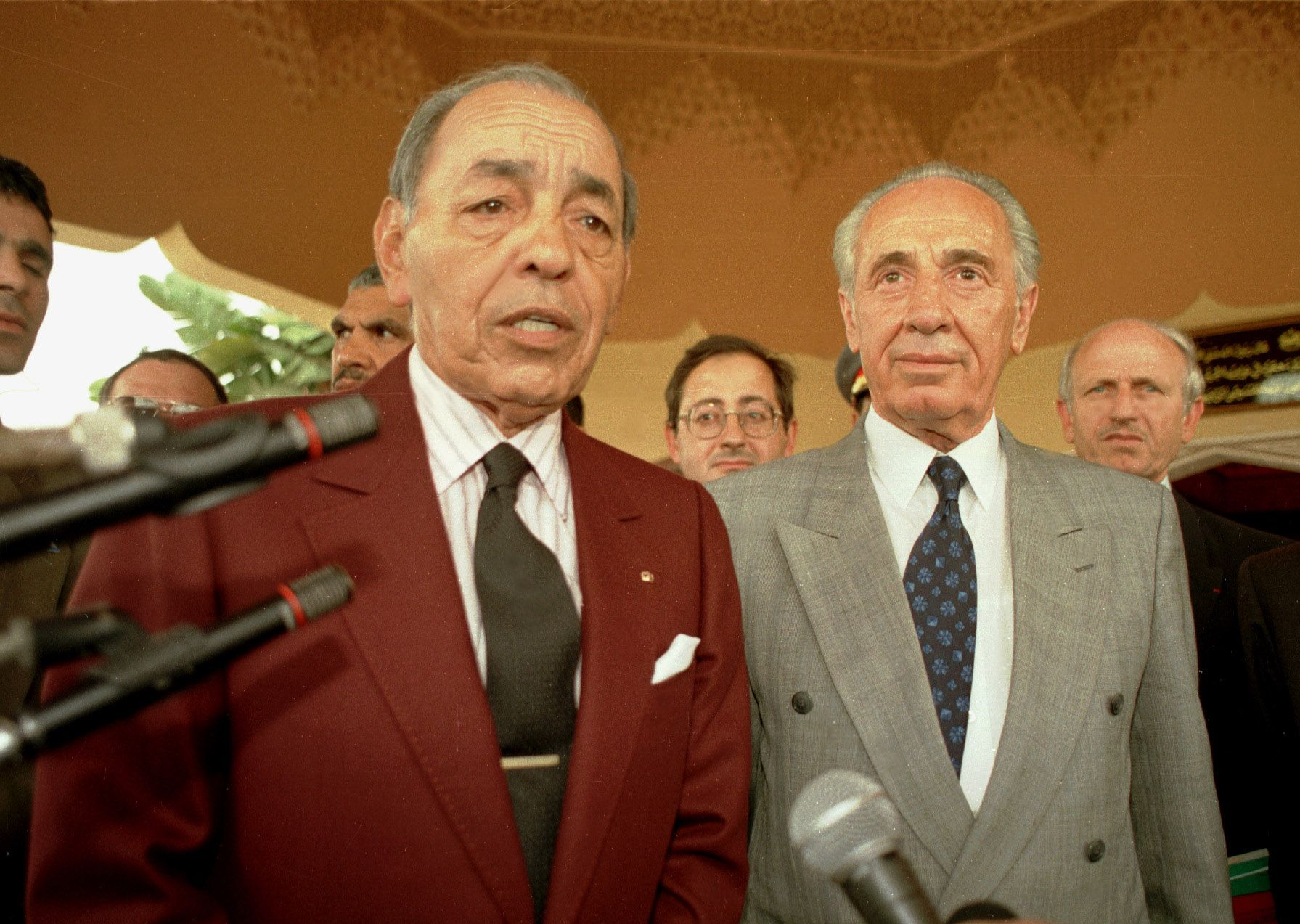
Hassan II and Israeli foreign minister Shimon Peres, 1994

Under Hassan II's reign, the topic of Israel remained highly controversial within Morocco, leading to all contacts and negotiations with the Israeli state being conducted clandestinely and away from public scrutiny.

==== ha-Misgeret 'The Framework' ====
In 1955, the Mossad, especially David Ben-Gurion and Isser Harel, established ha-Misgeret (המסגרת 'The Framework'), a clandestine, underground Zionist militia and organization in Morocco headed by Shlomo Havilio ('Louis'). Its agents were European and Israeli Jews, and it served as Mossad's base in Morocco. An 'Ulpan' kindergarten for teaching Hebrew in Casablanca established in 1954 by Yehudit Galili, an envoy of the Jewish Agency, would serve as a hiding place for weapons of ha-Misgeret. Galili herself would join and serve ha-Misgeret as a spy and recruiter. After Moroccan independence in 1956, through an agreement between Isser Harel of the Mossad and Shlomo Zalman Shragai of the Jewish Agency, the two organizations would organize the clandestine migration of Moroccan Jews by land and by sea.

===== Pisces Affair =====
The 10 January 1961 sinking of the Pisces, a ship that ha-Misgeret of the Mossad leased, renamed Egoz (אגוז 'hazelnut'), and operated to clandestinely transport Moroccan Jews from the Gulf of Alhucemas to Israel via Gibraltar against Moroccan law, resulted in the death of 46 of the people aboard. Morocco was held responsible for the disaster in the press of the US, Europe, and Israel and subsequently eased its policies on Zionist emigration under international pressure.

==== Operation Yachin (1961–1964) ====
From 1961 to 1964, almost 90,000 Moroccan Jews were migrated to Israel in Operation Yachin, an Israeli-led initiative in which the Hebrew Immigrant Aid Society paid King Hassan II a sum per capita for each Moroccan Jew who migrated to Israel.

According to Elie Podeh, the Mossad established an office in Morocco in 1963. Podeh writes too that "the two countries enjoyed political relations over the years—King Hassan frequently met with political figures from Israel, usually in secret, especially with Shimon Peres."

==== 1965 Arab League Summit ====
Israeli journalist and author Ronen Bergman in his book Rise And Kill First: The Secret History of Israel's Targeted Assassinations writes that Moroccan dissident Mehdi Ben Barka was located in Paris by the Mossad on behalf of Moroccan intelligence before his disappearance. Bergman alleges that Hassan II then invited Israeli spies from Shin Bet and Mossad to spy on Arab leaders' activities at the 1965 Arab League Summit in Casablanca, which was instrumental in causing the Arabs' defeat to Israel in the 1967 Six-Day War.

In contrast, during the Yom Kippur War, Morocco supported the Arab coalition by sending an expeditionary force of 5,500 men to the Golan and the Sinai.

During 1980s, Hassan II attempted to break the deadlock to recognize Israel by meeting with Israeli prime minister Shimon Peres in Rabat in 1986, but was met with backlash and protests from the Arab League and Moroccans alike, forcing Hassan II to withdraw his attempt. Nonetheless, Hassan II maintained a bond with Peres, and Peres voiced his condolences when Hassan II died in 1999. According to The New York Times some diplomats said the Moroccan king's initiative to meet Mr. Peres, was the product of several factors. One factor, they said, was that King Hassan was increasingly frustrated by the lack of progress in the Middle East peace process, which has been stalemated. Even more important, diplomats said, was King Hassan's unsuccessful efforts to convene an Arab summit meeting here, despite months of maneuvering and overtures to ''moderate'' Arab leaders.

=== Reign of Mohammed VI (1999–present) ===
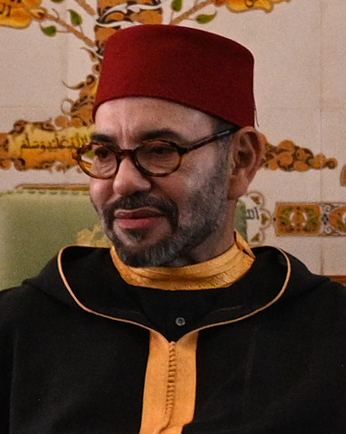
King of Morocco Mohammed VI

Like late Hassan II, his son King Mohammed VI of Morocco, whose reign began in 1999, maintained unofficial relations with Israel. Mohammed VI's advisor, André Azoulay, is an instrumental Jewish Moroccan who facilitated the growth of Morocco in both economic and political terms.

Morocco also attempted to solve the Israeli–Palestinian conflict by dispatching another Jewish aide close to Israel, Sam Ben Shitrit, to solve the conflict and make peace between the two.

The two countries established low-level diplomatic relations during the 1990s following Israel's interim peace accords with the Palestinian Authority. Until the early 2000s, Morocco operated a liaison office in Tel Aviv and Israel one in Rabat, until they both were closed during the Second Intifada. The two countries have maintained informal ties since then, with an estimated 50,000 Israelis traveling to Morocco each year on trips to learn about the Jewish community and retrace their family histories.

Due to the growing anti-Iranian sentiment on both sides, as both countries have problems with the Iranian regime led by conservative Islamists, Morocco and Israel have sought to make their ties closer. Both countries participated in the US-led February 2019 Warsaw Conference, aimed to be anti-Iranian.

In January 2020, Morocco received three Israeli drones as part of a $48 million arms deal.

==== Israel–Morocco normalization agreement ====
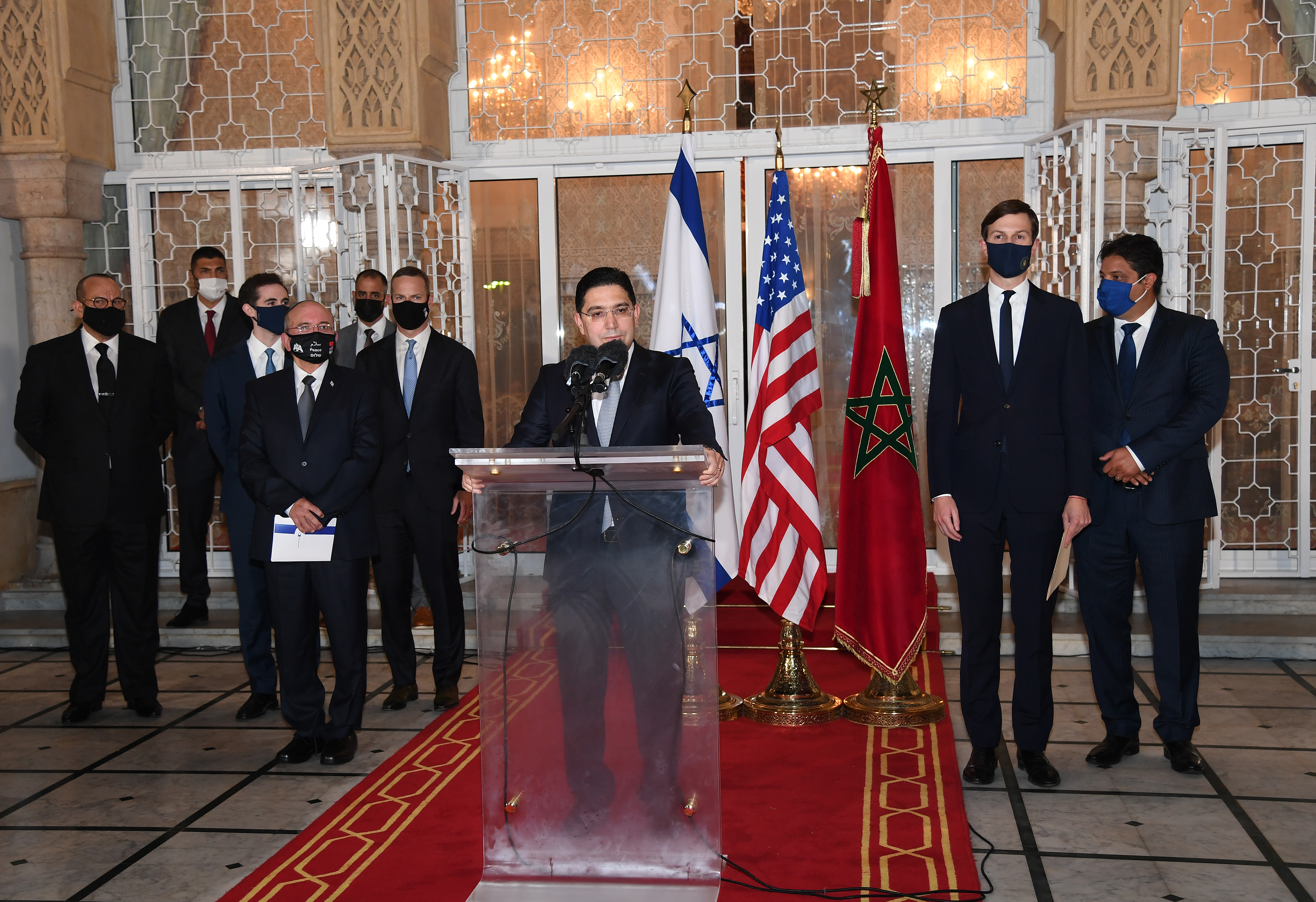
Visit of American-Israeli delegation to Rabat, December 2020

===== Morocco recognizes Israeli sovereignty =====
In September 2020, U.S. president Donald Trump announced he was seeking direct flights between Rabat and Tel Aviv.

On 10 December 2020, Donald Trump announced that Israel and Morocco had agreed to establish full diplomatic relations. Morocco then communicated to Israeli prime minister Benjamin Netanyahu its recognition of Israel. As part of the agreement, the United States agreed to recognize Morocco's Annexation of Western Sahara while urging the parties to "negotiate a mutually acceptable solution" using Morocco's autonomy plan as the only framework. Joint Declaration of the Kingdom of Morocco, the United States of America and the State of Israel was signed on 22 December 2020.

On 22 December, El Al launched the first direct commercial flight between Israel and Morocco following the normalization agreement. Senior advisor to the U.S. president Jared Kushner and Israel's national security advisor Meir Ben-Shabbat were among the high-level officials on board the flight.

On 25 July 2021, two Israeli carriers launched direct commercial flights to Marrakesh from Tel Aviv. On 11 August 2021, Morocco and Israel signed three accords on political consultations, aviation and culture. In November 2021, Morocco and Israel signed a defense agreement.

Israeli president Isaac Herzog and King Mohammed VI began a correspondence after the normalization of relations. Herzog sent King Mohammed a letter during Foreign Minister Yair Lapid’s visit to Morocco, and the King replied in August 2021 with a letter in which he wrote: “I am convinced that we shall make this momentum sustainable in order to promote the prospects of peace for all peoples in the region.” Herzog also sent condolences to King Mohammed after the tragic death of the little boy Rayan, who died after falling down a well, prompting a high-profile rescue effort.

In 2022, Israel and Morocco agreed to cooperate on sustainable agriculture, and aimed to boost ties in tech. The following year, the two countries agreed to cooperate on desalination and food security projects, signed an MOU to collaborate on aeronautics and Artificial intelligence, aimed to boost bilateral cooperation in the fields of innovation and scientific research, and aimed for closer military and cybersecurity ties.

On May 29, 2023, Miri Regev visited Morocco in an official capacity as the Israeli Transport Minister, marking the first trip by an Israeli Transport Minister to the North African nation. Regev's trip had a personal dimension as her father was born in Morocco, and she planned to light a candle at her late grandfather’s grave in tribute to her Moroccan heritage. The visit drew controversy from several political parties, such as the Democratic Federation of Leftists (FGD), the Party of Progress and Socialism (PPS), and the Justice and Development Party (PJD), due to their opposition to normalizing relations with Israel. During her visit, Regev met her Moroccan counterpart, Mohammed Abdeljalil, the Minister of Transport and Logistics. They signed three agreements focused on transport cooperation, including mutual recognition of driving licenses, fostering direct maritime transport, and enhancing collaboration on road safety measures and innovation.

===== Israel recognizes Moroccan sovereignty over Western Sahara =====
On July 17, 2023, Israeli prime minister Benjamin Netanyahu recognized Morocco's sovereignty over the Western Sahara in a letter to King Mohammed VI. Netanyahu stated that Israel's decision would be applied in all relevant governmental actions and communicated to the United Nations, regional and international organizations, and all countries with which Israel has diplomatic relations. He also expressed a favorable consideration for opening a consulate in the city of Dakhla, located in the Western Sahara.

In September 2023, it was announced that in a historic first, the head of Morocco's Senate, Enaam Mayara, would visit the Israeli Knesset on September 7.

Benjamin Netanyahu's 30 May 2024 appearance on La Chaîne Info with of a map of Morocco without Western Sahara caused outrage among Moroccans, with Moroccan newspapers seeing it as a provocation. Israeli Foreign Ministry spokesperson Hassan Kaabia called it a mistake.

Moroccans continued to express opposition to the normalization of ties amid Israel’s ongoing military campaign in Gaza, with demonstrations in April 2025 and April 2026.

== Moroccan Jewish community ==
Jews have a long presence in Morocco, where they are once were the largest Jewish community in the Arab world. After the establishment of the State of Israel in 1948, many Moroccan Jews went to Israel.

== Post-normalization relationship ==
=== Military rapprochement ===
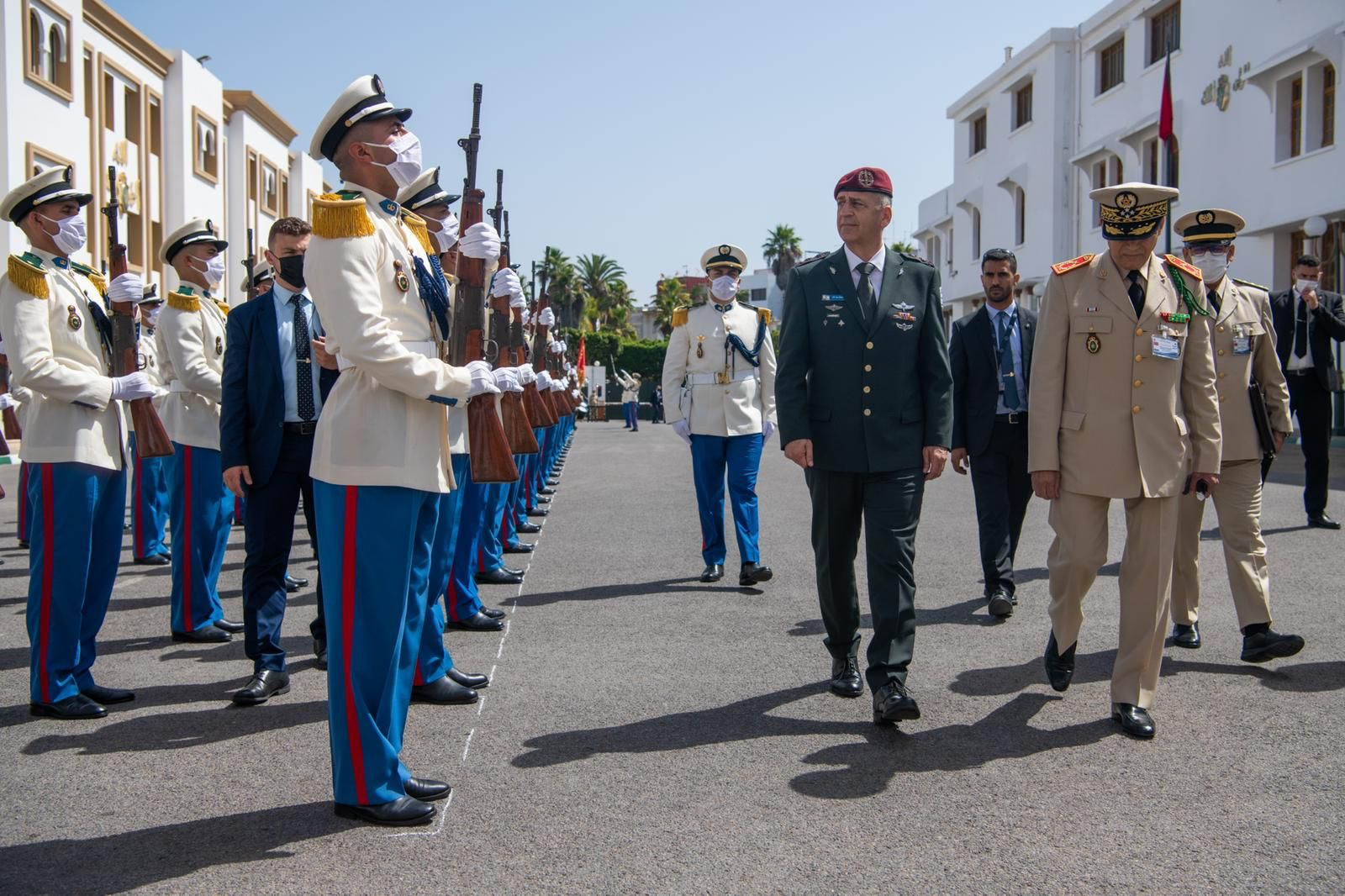
Visit of the Chief of the Israeli Army, Aviv Kochavi, to Morocco in 2022

In July 2022, it was the first time that the Chief of the Israeli Army, Aviv Kochavi, made an official visit to Morocco, strengthening their strategic and military alliance.

In June 2023, Israel participated for the first time in the African Lion military manoeuvres. According to the Israeli military spokesperson, "A delegation of 12 soldiers and officers from the Golani Reconnaissance Battalion left Israel on Sunday to take part in the African Lion 2023 manoeuvres, which are taking place in Morocco". However, the previous year, the Israeli army participated in African Lion as international military observers, which means that its soldiers did not take part in the exercises.

=== Official visits ===
On June 7, 2023, Amir Ohana (himself of Moroccan origin), the leader of the Israeli parliament affiliated with Likud (a right-wing party), made the first official visit to the Moroccan parliament, a historic milestone as the first visit to a Muslim country.

=== Upgraded diplomatic connections ===
In September 2026, the two nations announced that they would upgrade diplomatic ties, establish embassies and resume flights between the two countries.

=== Resumption of air travel ===
In November 2026, El Al announced that it would resume a pair of flights each week on the route between Ben Gurion International Airport in Israel and Marrakesh Menara Airport in Morocco starting in December, marking a return to service that had been suspended in October 2023. Arkia service is set to restart in January 2027.

== See also ==
- Arab–Israeli normalization
- History of the Jews in Morocco
  - Moroccan Jews in Israel
- Moroccan Jewish Museum
