= Anti-Moroccan sentiment =

Dislike, hatred, or persecution of Moroccans

Anti-Moroccan sentiment, also known as Moroccophobia, anti-Moroccanism and Maghreb-phobia, refers to the dislike, hatred, discrimination, deliberate sidelining, erasure or persecution of Moroccans, the country of Morocco, or Moroccan culture. Anti-Moroccan sentiment has taken root mainly in several nations like Algeria, Spain, the Netherlands, Belgium, and France, although it is also much broader due to Morocco's position in the Arab world.

== Spain ==
Due to the historical Reconquista, various Muslim kingdoms traced origins from modern-day Morocco were liquidated, with the last being the Emirate of Granada in 1492. After the Granada War, the Spanish monarchy issued a decree, confirming the expulsion of Jews and Muslims from Spain, forcing many Moroccan Muslims and Jews to flee the country. The creation of the Spanish Inquisition court across the country later on further accelerated anti-Moroccan policies, as the Spanish authorities sought to rout away those deemed to be "fake Catholics"; today, the number of fatalities remains unknown.

In the late 19th century, taking advantage of the weakening of the Alawi Sultanate, Spain occupied parts of Morocco, mainly the Rif and Western Sahara, and simultaneously governed Morocco alongside France. Heavy oppression and exploitation pushed Moroccan Rif into revolting against the Spanish rule; Spanish troops, in response, deployed chemical weapons, causing catastrophic environmental damages across the Rif region.

In modern era, Moroccans form one of the most notable migrant groups in Spain due to the proximity between two countries (in fact, Moroccans are the largest migrant group in Spain). However, relations with the Spanish population have been complicated and deeply rooted in Islamophobia due to terrorist attacks like the 2004 Madrid train bombings or the 2017 Barcelona attacks; the fact that these attacks were caused by Moroccans have caused a deep resentment and distrust toward Moroccans in many corners of Spanish society. Moroccans are frequently stereotyped as terrorists in various Spanish social media and online channels in the country.

Multiple anti-Moroccan riots have broken out in Spain in recent years, such as the 2000 El Ejido riots, when three Spanish nationals were murdered by people believed to be of Moroccan origins. In 2025, after a Spanish elder was assaulted by a group of North African migrants, widespread unrest in Torre-Pacheco occurred and hate messages against Moroccans were amplified on social media.

== France ==
Unlike Spain's complex ties with Moroccans, France's connection with Moroccans only began during the French protectorate in Morocco. Nonetheless, Moroccans in France are some of the largest migrant groups in the country (often being grouped among other North Africans like Tunisians and Algerians), and their complex relations with the French hosts have resulted in multiple incidents against Moroccans in the country.

In 2015, the deadly November attacks in Paris, which were done by Moroccan jihadists with links to the Islamic State, triggered widespread anti-Moroccan hatred on social media among French. During the 2022 FIFA World Cup semi-final encounter between France and Morocco, which France won 2–0, anti-Moroccan sentiment spiked immediately among French far-right nationalists, who saw them with suspicion for disloyalty.

Mehdi Zaidaoui, a Moroccan-French sociologist, admitted Moroccans, like other North African groups, were seen as threats by other Frenchmen. Far-right politicians in France have frequently used these Moroccan-linked events, treating Moroccans as forms of a social and security danger that risk undermining French sovereignty.

== Low Countries ==
Belgium and the Netherlands have some of the highest portions of Moroccan migrants alongside France and Spain, and thus, multiple anti-Moroccan incidents have happened, especially in recent years.

In 2004, Dutch filmmaker Theo van Gogh, a descendant of Vincent van Gogh, was murdered by a Moroccan Islamist. After the murder, anti-Moroccan unrest broke out in the Netherlands, with mosques and madrasas vandalised and Moroccan Muslims assaulted.

Similarly, in 2016, Brussels experienced a series of terrorist attacks by nationals of Moroccan origins, have led to multiple hate speeches to be incited against Moroccans; Moroccans have been stigmatised and discriminated as the result. During the 2022 FIFA World Cup, Moroccan fans caused widespread violence in Belgium; as such, they were viewed with deep suspicion by the Belgian populace. Increasing attempts to curb illegal Moroccan aliens in Belgium have further marginalised the Moroccan community in the country.

In 2021, a survey in the Netherlands said about 35% Moroccans felt discriminated and marginalised in the country, the highest among all migrant group in the Netherlands. Similarly, studies in Belgium also shared the same issue, which Moroccans felt deeply excluded in Belgian society. Molenbeek-Saint-Jean, located in Belgium, has a large Moroccan presence; it also earned an infamous nickname as the jihadist capital of Europe due to radicalisation and widespread criminal activities of Moroccans there.

== Algeria ==
Despite sharing a similar Maghrebi culture, since Algeria's independence in 1962, relations between Morocco and Algeria have been hostile, partially due to Morocco being a conservative monarchy while Algeria is a revolutionary state.

In 1963, Morocco and Algeria went to a dispute that erupted into a short war between the two nations. Relations between the two soured again in 1975, following Spanish departure from Western Sahara; Algeria threw weight behind Polisario while Morocco instigated the Green March, resulted in war between the two state again over dominance in the Maghreb region; today, the conflict remains unsolved.

In 1994, Morocco accused the Algerian Secret Service of being behind the Marrakesh attack of 1994, where two Spaniards were killed, and imposed visa requirement on Algerians and nationals of Algerian origin. The immediate response by the Algerian government was the closure of the border with Morocco.

In 2021, diplomatic between the two nations was severed due to renewal of hostilities. In September 2024, Algeria imposed visas on Moroccans and accused Morocco of engaging in "various actions that threaten Algeria's stability", including "Zionist espionage" and "drug and human trafficking".

Additionally, anti-Moroccan acts in Algeria are also manifested in other fields outside politics. Several football incidents have also been related to this standoff. During the 2022 Mediterranean Games in Oran, two Moroccan journalists were denied entry to watch Morocco's football games, sparking outrage in Morocco. In 2023, then-defending champions Morocco withdrew from the 2022 African Nations Championship hosted in Algeria after Algeria refused to open airspace for Moroccan carrier. A year later, a supposed 2023–24 CAF Confederation Cup semi-final game between USM Alger and RS Berkane was unable to take part after a shirt dispute, with the Moroccan representative wearing their jerseys supporting Moroccan claim of Western Sahara; subsequently, USM Alger was disqualified and Berkane walked straight to the final.

A pejorative term for Morocco and Moroccans, "Makhzen" (المخزن), meaning "warehouse" or "storage", has been used by Algerians to criticise the Moroccan government as an undemocratic and autocratic regime, even though its original meaning had been about the political structure native to the Maghreb.

== Palestine ==
Although the majority of Moroccans are sympathetic to Palestinians, Palestinians have, in some instances, expressed anti-Moroccan sentiment. The best example of it is the tacit solidarity between the Palestine Liberation Organization's leadership with that of Polisario, which angered Rabat; the fact that Polisario's flag was modelled after that of Palestine also did little to reduce anti-Moroccan feelings among Palestinians. These acts have not been well received by Moroccans, who believe their supports were rewarded with betrayal from the Palestinians.

Additionally, Palestine's Moroccophobia is also stemmed from the scar of the Six-Day War in 1967, when, two years before the war, at the Arab League meeting in Casablanca 1965, Hassan II and the Moroccan authorities secretly invited Mossad and Shin Bet to spy on other Arab leaders, enabling the win for Israel; plus, a large portion of Israeli population is from Morocco, making Palestinians deeply sceptical of Morocco as an honest Arab partner.

== Syria ==
Until the fall of Assad regime in 2024, the Ba'athist regime had a very strained tie with Morocco, having backed Polisario during the Western Sahara War. In 2012, the Moroccan embassy was ransacked by pro-Assad protesters.

== Israel ==
Moroccan Jews are one of the most notable communities in Israel, many having migrated during the reign of King Hassan II via tacit agreements between Rabat and Tel Aviv. However, Moroccan Jews have been viewed with distrust and are often stereotyped for criminal activities, and, because of their stronger link to Arab Maghrebi culture, they are also often lumped together with Israeli Arabs and suffer hate messages. Some Moroccan Jews have referred to the European Jewish ruling class as "having the hearts of the Germans."

The dehumanising term, Maroco sakin (מרוקו סכין), meaning "Moroccan knives", is a slur used directly against the Moroccan Jewish population.

== See also ==
- Anti-Arab racism
- Anti-Somali sentiment
- Islamophobia
- Maroco sakin
