= Migration of Moroccan Jews to Israel =

20th-century population movement event

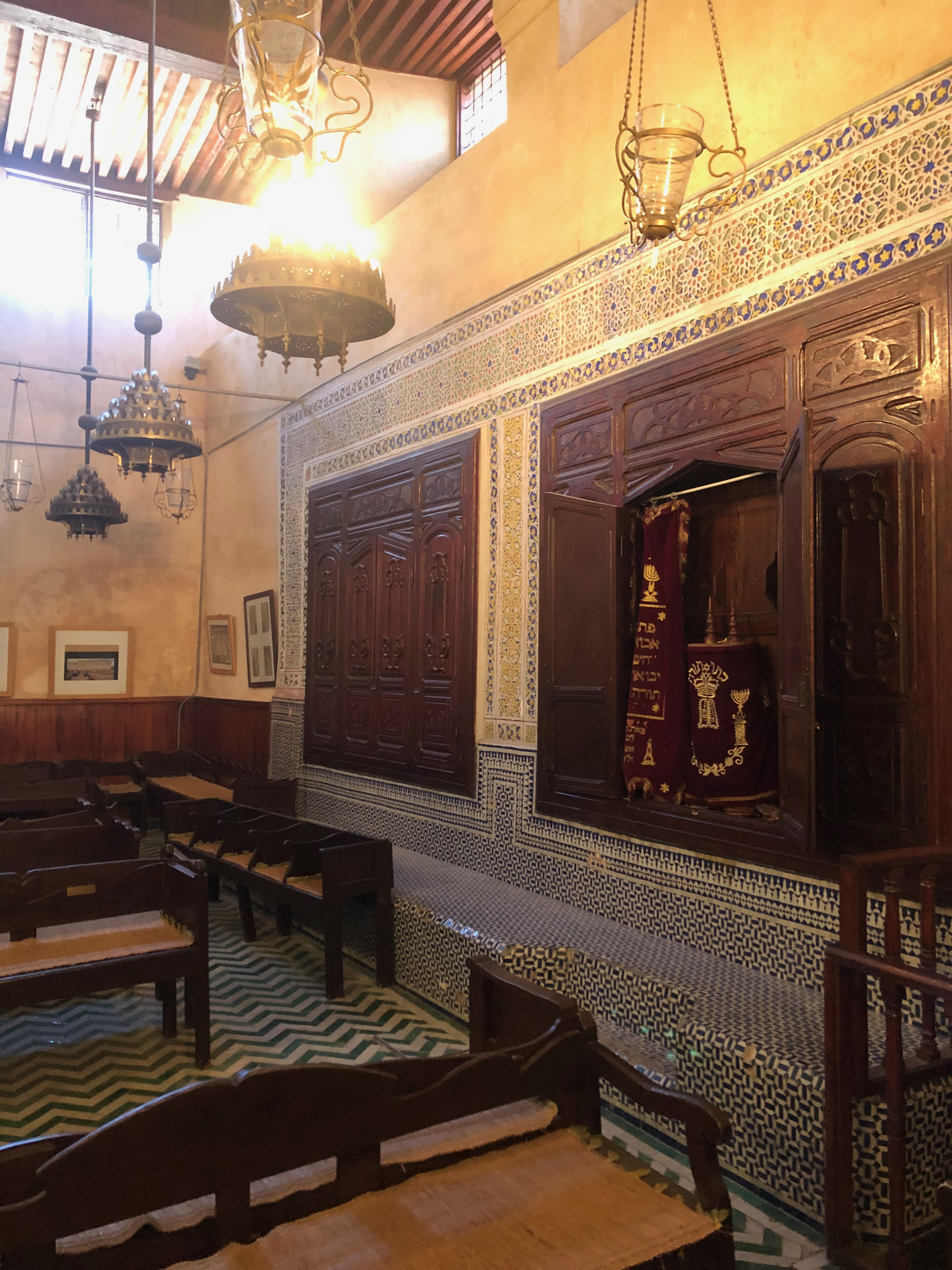
An empty synagogue in Fes.

Before the establishment of the State of Israel in 1948, very few Moroccan Jews migrated to Palestine. Although the spread of Zionism in Morocco began at the turn of the 20th century, only starting in 1948 was there significant Zionist emigration from Morocco. From 1947 to 1949 the Jewish Agency organized emigration, though it was illegal; prospective migrants caught attempting to cross the border into Algeria would be sent back. Clandestine migration through Algeria during the Palestine war led to the 1948 anti-Jewish riots in Oujda and Jerada in June.

There were concerns that Morocco's eventual independence from France might result in the persecution of the country's Jewish population, prompted a substantial wave of emigration. Between 1948 and 1951, approximately 28,000 Jews made Aliyah to Israel through Cadima, a Zionist apparatus operated by Jewish Agency and Mossad Le'Aliyah envoys sent from Israel. From 1951 to 1953, Cadima restricted the migration of Moroccan Jews through discriminatory criteria known as seleqṣeya.

With the return of Mohammed V and the subsequent declaration of Morocco's independence in 1956, Jewish residents were granted Moroccan citizenship. These differences included travel restrictions abroad. In 1959, due to pressure from the Arab League, Jewish emigration was officially prohibited if the intended destination was Israel. As a result, most immigration occurred clandestinely through an underground Jewish organization in Morocco, with routes often passing through Spain and France.

Between 1961 and 1964, Operation Yachin saw Mossad and HIAS strike a clandestine agreement with King Hassan II to covertly facilitate the migration of Moroccan Jews to Israel. During this three-year span, Moroccan Jewish immigration to Israel reached its zenith, with 97,000 individuals departing for Israel via both air and sea routes from Casablanca and Tangier, transiting through France and Italy. As part of this migration, Morocco received "indemnities" in compensation for the loss of its Jewish population.

By 1967, approximately 250,000 Jews had left Morocco, with some seeking refuge in Europe and the United States, while a significant portion chose to immigrate to Israel. All in all, 274,180 individuals are recorded to have emigrated from Morocco to Israel between the establishment of the state in 1948 and 2016. Moroccan Jewish immigrants in Israel faced numerous challenges related to cross-cultural adaptation and integration, which eventually became defining aspects of this immigration wave. The cultural barriers and discrimination they encountered prompted protests (such as the Wadi Salib riots) and, over time, contributed to a gradual transformation in the Israeli political landscape.

== Before the establishment of the State of Israel ==
=== Migration of David ben Shimon and his disciples ===
Rabbi David ben Shimon and his disciples migrated to Palestine, or the Land of Israel in the Jewish tradition, and established Mahane Israel outside the Old City of Jerusalem in 1867. Ben Shimon left Rabat in 1854 intending to devote himself to religious scholarship in Jerusalem, where he organized an autonomous community of Moroccan Jews.

== After the establishment of the state of Israel ==
Notable numbers of Moroccans came to Palestine, and subsequently Israel, during the 1947–1949 Palestine war. From 1949 to 1956, Cadima, a Zionist apparatus administered by Mossad Le' Aliyah and Jewish Agency emissaries sent from Israel, oversaw the emigration of Moroccan Jews to the newly established State of Israel. Some of the migrants became disgruntled at what they perceived to be racist attitudes among Ashkenazim. In this early period the majority (70%) either wished to return to Morocco, or advised their families not to follow them to Israel, given the discrimination they encountered. Upon the establishment of the State of Israel, the majority Moroccan Jewry, which held Zionist-religious values, awoke to the possibility of migration to Israel.

=== Riots in Oujda and Jerada ===
The 1948 UN declaration of the founding of the state of Israel worsened the situation in Morocco. The Moroccan Nationalist Movement, carrying the flag of the Arab League, incited against the Jews, and the Moroccan nationalist press (namely the newspaper Al Alam) promoted hostility. A few days before pogroms broke out, death threats were made against Jews, and on the day of the June 7 massacre, no Arabs showed up to work for Jewish employers. Riots commenced in the city of Oujda at 9:30 in the morning. A mob armed with axes and knives gathered at the "shuk al Yahud" (Jewish market) in Oujda and killed five people, four Jewish and one French. Police eventually gained control and the crowd dispersed. In a nearby area, a group of Muslims gathered, armed with axes, picks and knives, and rode on buses towards the coal mining town of Jerada. In Jarada, this group spread a rumor that a Jew murdered a Muslim, triggering a massacre of 38 Jews, including the community's Rabbi (Rabbi Moshe Cohen), his wife, his mother and his three children. A total of 44 people were murdered that day, and another 55 were wounded by rioters in the cities of Jerada and Oujda. Additionally, shops and homes of Jews were looted. The French military court in Casablanca tried 35 rioters for the massacre. Two defendants were sentenced to death, two to hard labor for life, and the rest to a variety of different penalties.

The year 1954 saw additional pogroms against Moroccan Jews, considerable theft of property, and arson at "Kol Israel Haverim" schools. These incidents increased the emigration rate of Moroccan Jews.

=== Emigration through Cadima and Seleqseya ===
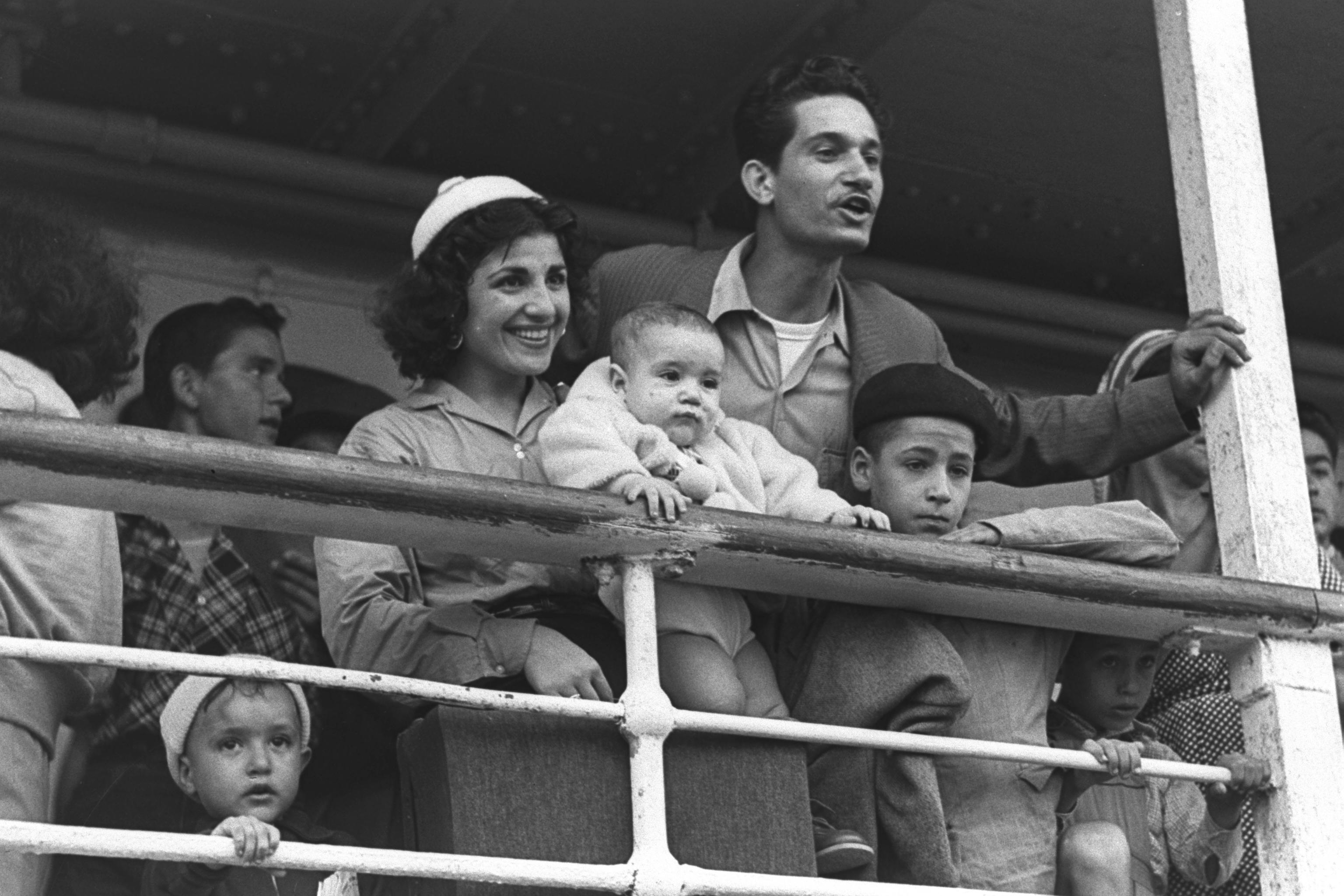
Moroccan Jewish immigrants arriving in Israel, 1954. From 1949 to 1956, Cadima migrated over 60,000 Moroccan Jews to Israel.

Cadima (Hebrew: קדימה) was the Zionist apparatus that oversaw the mass migration of Moroccan Jews to Israel from 1949 to 1956—about 90,000 in total, with a major escalation in the years preceding Moroccan independence. The apparatus was administered by Jewish Agency and Mossad Le'Aliyah agents sent from Israel, with assistance from local Moroccan Zionists. It was based out of an office in Casablanca and operated cells in large cities as well as a transit camp along the road to al-Jadida, from which Jewish migrants would depart for Israel via Marseille. From mid-1951 to 1953, Cadima applied the Seleqṣeya (Hebrew: הסלקציה), an Israeli policy that imposed criteria for immigration that discriminated against poor Moroccan Jews, families without a breadwinner in the age range of 18–45, and families with a member in need of medical care.

=== Policy Instated by Mohammed V ===
When Mohammed V returned from exile, he decided he wanted the Jews to remain in Morocco after its independence from France in 1956; Jewish citizens were given equal rights. King Mohammed V was willing to integrate the Jews in the parliament and position them in prominent roles. The League of Arab states began operating in Morocco, influencing Morocco's political parties and causing anti-Semitism, leading the Moroccan government to refuse to recognize the State of Israel. This environment caused less affluent Jews to request to leave Morocco as soon as possible. Following the mass exodus, which did not please the Moroccan government, Zionism was outlawed and defined as a serious crime in 1959, and immigration to Israel was banned, forcing Moroccan Jews to flee the country by sea only, towards Spain or France. Following the emigration ban, a large number of international organizations cooperated with the Israeli government to do everything in their capacity to persuade Moroccan authorities to allow Jewish citizens of Morocco to leave the country. Representatives of the various Jewish organizations succeeded in forming good relations with the Moroccan authorities, however they failed to convince them to allow the Jews to leave. Nevertheless, Israel had sent dozens of Mossad officers to North Africa who carried out an operation ("operation frame") that enabled illegal emigration of Moroccan Jews. Many local young people joined the operation. Between the years 1948 - 1955 around 70,000 Jews left Morocco. Between the years 1955 - 1961 around 60,000 Jews left Morocco.

=== Ha-Misgeret ===
The Framework or ha-Misgeret (Hebrew: המסגרת) was a clandestine Zionist apparatus established by the Mossad that was active in Morocco from 1956–1964. It supported and facilitated the migration of Moroccan Jews to Israel.

=== Pisces Affair ===
The Pisces Affair was the sinking 10 January 1961 of the Pisces, renamed Egoz (Hebrew: אֱגוֹז hazelnut), a ship leased and managed by ha-Misgeret of the Mossad, operating as foreign agents in Morocco, for the clandestine migration of Moroccan Jews from the Gulf of Alhucemas in the Rif to Gibraltar. The sinking resulted in the death of 46 of the people aboard. From Gibraltar, the migrants were then to have gone to Israel at a time when the immigration of Moroccan Jews to Israel was illegal under Moroccan law.

The event had a dramatic impact on politics in Morocco. Morocco was held responsible for the disaster in the international press, and it then eased its policies on Zionist emigration. The newspaper at-Tahrir of the National Union of Popular Forces (UNFP) saw the policy change as a direct consequence of pressure from the United States, Europe, and Israel.

=== Operation Yachin: Emigration under Hassan II of Morocco ===
Policy changed with the accession of Hassan II of Morocco in 1961. After the US provided food support to Morocco in the drought of 1957, Hassan II agreed to accept a $100 per-capita bounty from the American Hebrew Immigrant Aid Society, which acted as a cover for Israeli emigration agents, for each Jew who emigrated from Morocco—a total of $500,000 for the first 50,000 Moroccan Jews, followed by $250 for each Jew thereafter. Between the years 1961 - 1967 around 120,000 Jews left Morocco.

The Six-Day War in 1967 led to another wave of emigration of Jews from Morocco, primarily to France, but also to Canada, the United States, Israel and other countries.

=== Operation Mural ===
In 1961, British political activist David Littman led a clandestine mission assisted by the Mossad to illegally transport 530 Jewish Moroccan children from Morocco to Israel, under the guise of their attending a summer camp in Switzerland. The operation was arranged in coordination with the Œuvre de secours aux enfants.

=== Integration of Moroccan Jews in Israel ===
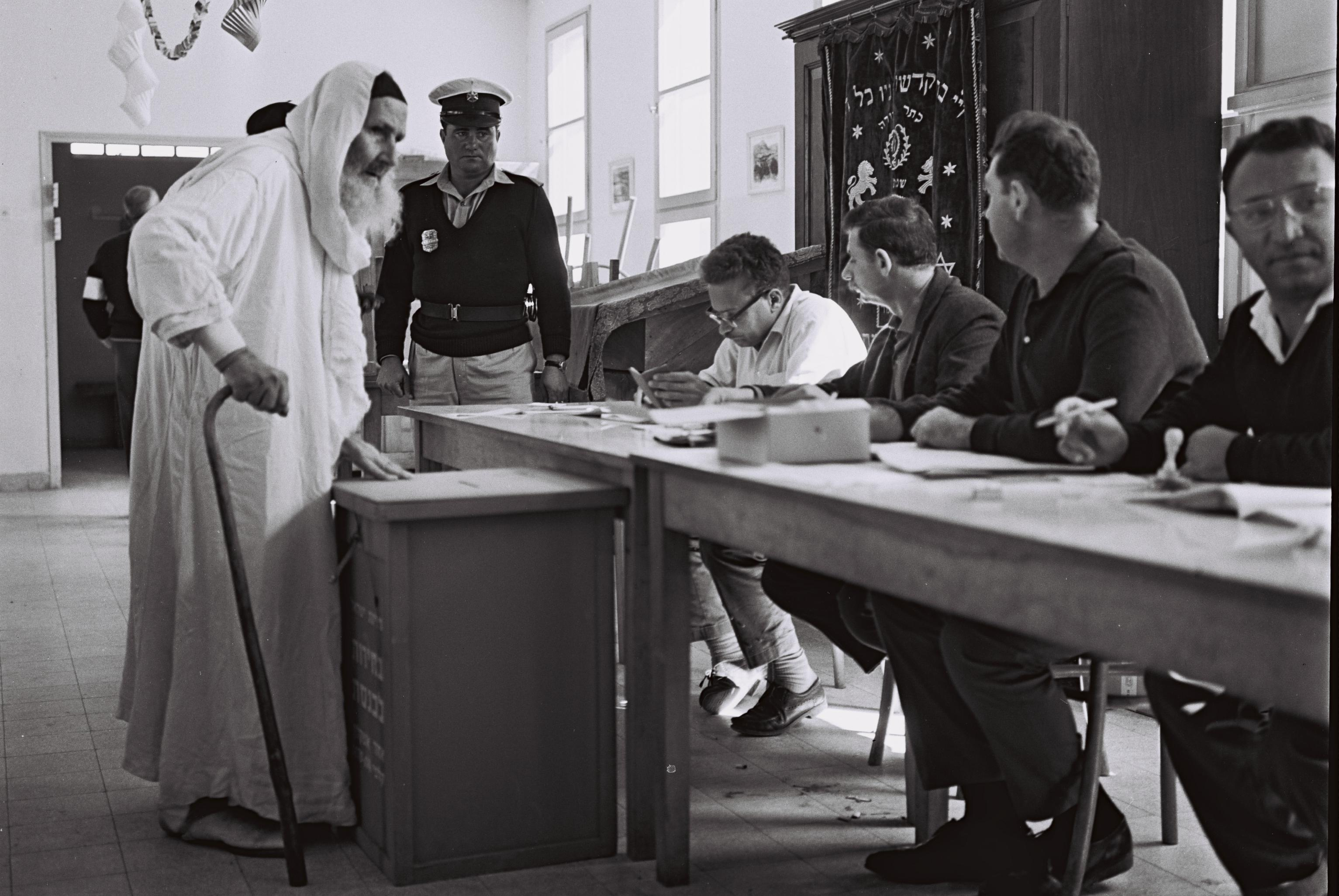
Elder Israeli citizen of Moroccan origin voting in the 1965 Israeli legislative election, Ashdod

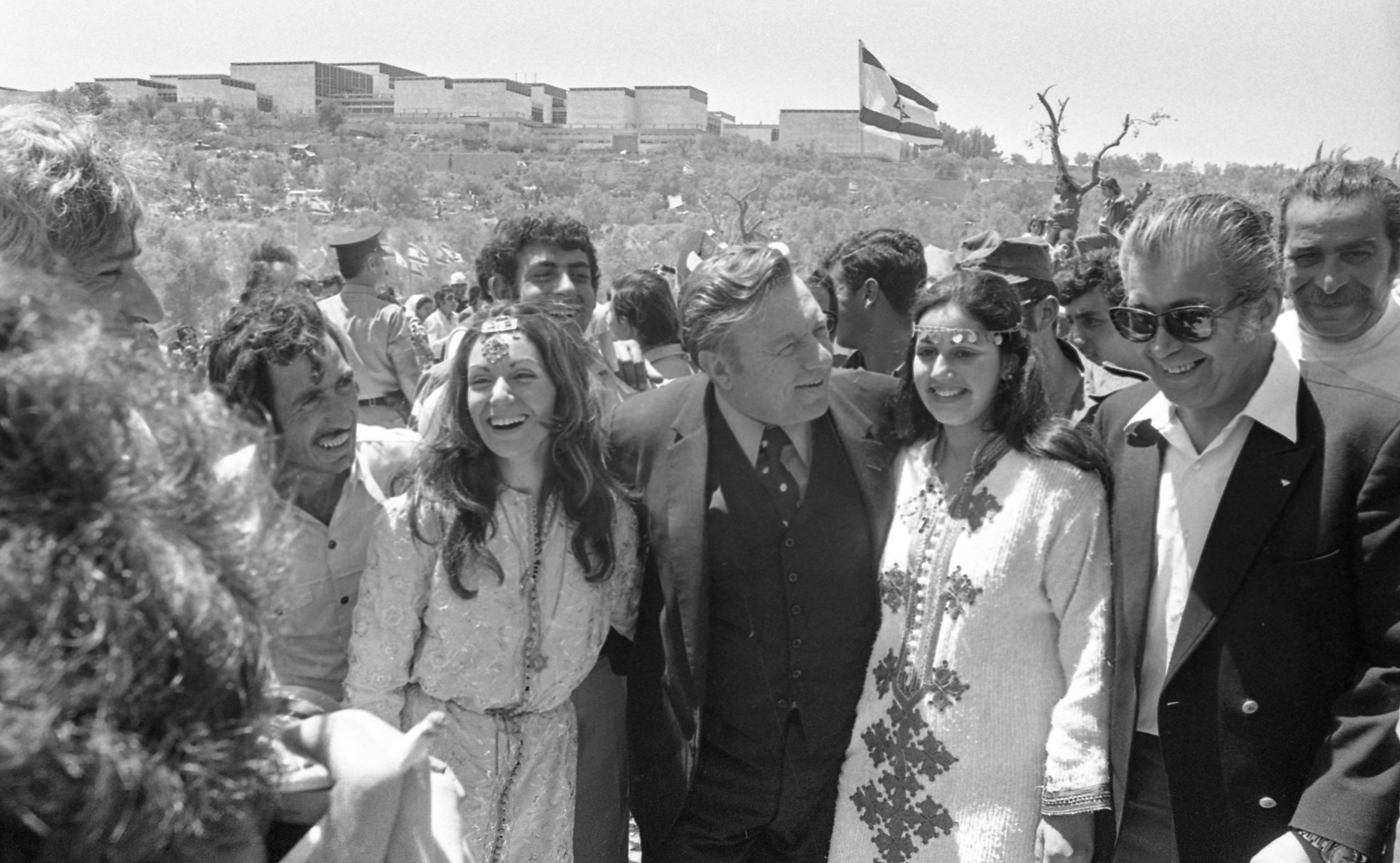
Moroccan Jews celebrating the Mimouna festival in Jerusalem, Israel, 1988

Immigration of Moroccan Jews to Israel encountered many difficulties. The new immigrants who were housed in transit camps, brought different ways of life and thought with them, which were misunderstood by the many immigrants originating from Europe. Most notable was the complaint of the Moroccan hot temper, which clashed with the neighbors' culture and slower temper. This was the origin of a stereotypical, derogatory nickname that stuck to these immigrants - Maroko Sakin / "Morocco knife."

The cultural gap and the overt and covert discrimination caused unrest across Israel. Already in the early years of statehood, with the establishment of the policy of population dispersal, there began to be signs of a struggle against the settlement coordinators who tried to halt the abandonment of settlements on the borders of Israel. The transition of Moroccans from villages on the frontier to the city and their rejection of an agricultural lifestyle was assumed to indicate their refusal to participate in productive enterprises and the Judaization of the land that the state intended for them, and an active strategy of dealing with separation and socialization processes which the country implemented in the 1950s. Discriminatory policies led to, among other things, an active protest whose two most prominent manifestations were the Wadi Salib events, led by David Ben-Arush against ongoing discrimination and the establishment of the Black Panthers movement. Their goal was to promote their social status and they fought passionately to earn their place in Israeli society. It took eighteen more years, after the events in 1977 in Wadi Salib for the North African immigrants to be heard clearly in national politics. In the 1977 revolution, their demographic power became evident where they succeeded in replacing the Mapai government by the Likud led by Menachem Begin. Many of the first and second generation of immigrants from Islamic countries (the "second Israel") felt that this change in regime would give them a voice and influence over the leadership of the state, which had previously been denied to them during Mapai's reign.

After settling in Israel, Moroccan Jews complained of discrimination and contempt from local Ashkenazi Jews. In 1950, the immigration office in Marseille handling prospective North African immigrants wrote that "these abject human beings" would have to be kneaded to shape them into Israeli citizens. Complaints were made about the influx of 'orientals', 'human refuse' and 'backward people'. Of the approximately 40,000 Moroccans who emigrated to Israel from 1949 to 1954, some 6% (2,466) returned to Morocco.

Nowadays, descendants of Moroccan immigration are found at the forefront in Israel in various roles. They are present in management, leading companies, command of the army, politics, sports and culture. Descendants of the Moroccan community now constitute one of the pillars of Israeli culture in such areas as television, theater, literature, song, poetry, and film.

== Interpretations ==
In Jewish Morocco, Emily Gottreich presents different views in the discussion about "whose fault it was that the Jews, acknowledged today on (almost) all sides as “true” Moroccans, left their ancestral land": In her words:

Moroccan Nationalist Movement blame the colonial powers for having destabilized the traditional social structures that had long sustained the Jews. The younger generation of Moroccans blames the Istiqlal for failing to be more inclusive. Popular opinion blames the Zionists for having “stolen” Morocco’s Jews. Zionists, meanwhile, tend to blame Moroccan Muslims as a whole for having endangered Jewish lives during tense times. Scholarly opinions are divided but generally grant more agency to Moroccan Jews themselves, such as Michael Laskier’s descriptions of the departure of Morocco’s Jews as a “self-liquidation process.” (Ironically, Islamists’ accusations of Jewish treachery likewise grant Jews more agency, however nefarious in nature.) Moroccan Jews themselves seem to still be working it out, with their views depending heavily on their present location and circumstances.

== See also ==
- Moroccan Jews
- Moroccan Jews in Israel
- Operation Yachin
- Operation Mural
