= Nicole Elgrissy =

Moroccan writer and activist

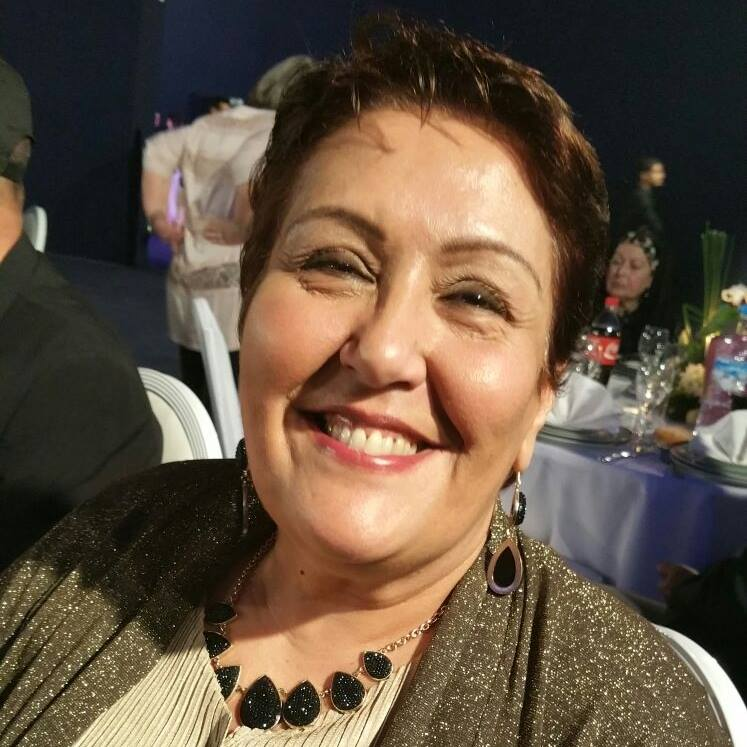
- Nicole Elgrissy in 2016
- Born: 23 September 1958
- Occupations: Writer, novelist, journalist, academic

Nicole Elgrissy (Arabic: نيكول الغريسي) (Casablanca, September 23, 1958), is a Moroccan writer and activist.

== Biography ==
Elgrissy was born in Casablanca, Morocco, to a Moroccan Jewish family originally from Essaouira. Her last name comes from Oued El Ghriss, a wadi in Saharan Morocco having its source in the eastern High Atlas; a street bears his name in Essaouira. Her father, Robert Elgrissy, an employee of CTM, is a recipient of the Order of Ouissam Alaouite and her mother, Simone Cohen, is a housewife. Her childhood was marked by the Six Day War and the mass exodus of the Moroccan Jewish community. She studied at the Lycée Lyautey, where she obtained a G3 baccalaureate in marketing techniques, and continued her studies in France, at the University of Paris-Nord and obtained a technical university degree (DUT) in business and administration management, in 1978. She returned to Morocco to work in marketing, communication and events, from 1979 to 2008.

== Literary career ==
The poet Fatima Chahid encouraged her to write. Her first book, La Renaicendre ou Mémoires d’une Marocaine juive et patriote (La Renaicendre or Memoirs of a Jewish and Patriotic Moroccan) was published in 2010; her memoir focuses on the events relating to the birth of the State of Israel, the emigration of Moroccan Jews to Israel and the struggles between the opposing movements of Zionism and Pan-Arabism, as well as the identity crisis for the Moroccan Jews as well as for Muslims in this period, and Morocco as an example of coexistence between Jews and Muslims, which she argues can be applied to the State of Israel. Also, in her book Elgrissy also analyzes the uprooting calls for the Moroccan Jews and Muslims to return to the motherland. A reviewed edition of her book was re-published in 2016 under the name of La Renaicendre, 6 ans plus tard on ebook format available on Amazon Kindle.

Her works remember and perpetuate the memory of the Moroccan Jewish heritage, such as the Mimouna Association, and the production of films and documentaries as Adieu meres of Mohamed Ismail, Où vas-tu Moshé? by Hassan Benjelloun, and Tinghir-Jérusalem: Les échos du Mellah by Kamal Hachkar . In 2015, she gave an interview in the Al Jazeera documentary, Return to Morocco.

Her novel Si c'était à refaire... (If it was to be remade) was published in 2016 it is related to the life of Moroccan Jewish and Muslim women.

== Activism ==
Elgrissy has taken part in a variety of initiatives aiming to perpetuate the Moroccan Jewish Heritage, like the Al Akhawayn University students' Association Mimouna, and the production of films and documentaries like Mohamed Ismaïl's Adieu Mères, Hassan Benjelloun's Où vas-tu Moshé? and Kamal Hachkar's Tinghir-Jérusalem : les échos du Mellah.

In 2015, she was for a documentary produced by Al Jazeera titled Return to Morocco, talking about Moroccan Jews who never left Morocco as well as those who returned.

== Bibliography ==
- La Renaicendre ou Mémoires d’une Marocaine juive et patriote, Afrique Orient, 2010, ISBN 978-9981257061
- Dames de cœur sur le carreau, Editeur de Talents, 2015, ISBN 978-9954954744
- Si c'était à refaire..., Lamia Darif, 2016
- Le réveil avant la dérive, Editions Chaaraoui, 2018, ISBN 978-9954643839
- Posologies de la Marocologie, Editions Chaaraoui, 2018, ISBN 978-9954643822
