= Regragui =

Regragui (Arabic: الركراكي, Tamazight: ⵔⴳⵔⴰⴳⵉ) is a Moroccan surname. Notable people with the surname include:

- Abdesselem Regragui (born 1939), Moroccan gymnast
- Fatima Regragui (1941–2021), Moroccan actress
- Hamza Regragui (born 1997), Moroccan footballer
- Hassan Regragui (born 1964), Moroccan footballer and manager
- Nezha Regragui (born 1957), Moroccan theatre, TV and film actress
- Walid Regragui (born 1975), Moroccan footballer and manager

== See also ==
- Sidi Aissa Regragui, a small town and rural commune in Marrakech-Tensift-Al Haouz, Morocco
