= Fatima Regragui =

Moroccan actress (1941–2021)

- Born: 15 February 1941
- Died: 2 August 2021 (aged 80)
- Occupation: Actress

Fatima Regragui (15 February 1941 - 2 August 2021) was a Moroccan actress.

== Career ==
Regragui launched her artistic career back in the 1950s. In 1975, she joined the troupe of the National Theatre Mohammed V in Rabat alongside Aziz Maouhoub, Mohamed El Jam, Malika El Omari and Nezha Regragui. She starred in several Moroccan films that have become cult such as Farewell Mother directed by Mohamed Ismaïl and Mirage, directed by Ahmed Bouanani.

== Partial filmography ==
=== Feature films ===
- 1960: Pour une bouchee de pain (Lokmat El Aich)
- 1968: Soleil du printemps (Chams Rabi'i)
- 1980: Mirage
- 1986: La compromission
- 2008: Farewell Mother

== Death ==
Regragui died in August 2021 at the age of 80, after battling a long illness. She had completely lost her vision shortly before her death.
