= Seleqseya =

Seleqṣeya (Hebrew: הסלקציה) was the Israeli policy of selective immigration imposed on poor Moroccan Jews adopted in mid 1951. It was applied by Cadima, the Zionist apparatus overseen by agents from Mossad LeAliyah and the Jewish Agency that administered the migration of Moroccan Jews to Israel from 1949 to 1956.

== History ==
In the summer of 1951, the recently established State of Israel sought to severely limit the immigration of poor Moroccan Jews by adopting Seleqṣeya, a policy of selective immigration. With this policy, the Jewish Agency discriminated against poor Moroccan Jews unable to pay for their own immigration, families without a breadwinner in the age range of 18–45, and families with a member in need of medical care. The American historian Norman Stillman described the Seleqṣeya as a "draconian and frequently cruel policy." This policy was also imposed to a lesser extent upon Tunisian Jews.

The policy caused bitterness among Moroccan and Maghrebi Jews. It was debated among members of Israeli administration, and it was rescinded in 1953 as Cadima sought to increase its activity in the twilight of French colonial rule in Morocco.

== Justifications ==
Stillman writes that when the Seleqṣeya was imposed, the recently established State of Israel was overwhelmed with immigrants and in a state of economic crisis. He adds that Jews living under French rule in the Maghreb were not perceived to be in the same kind of danger as Jews in Iraq, Yemen, and Libya. He also writes that, though it was not expressed, the policy may have been influenced by the prejudice of European Ashkenazim veterans in Israel against Sephardic/Mizrahi Jews in general, and Maghrebi Jews and Moroccan Jews in particular. Epithets such as Maroqo sakkin (מרוקו סכין 'Morocco of the knife) demonstrate the prejudiced view of Moroccans as primitive and violent.
