= El Mehdi (singer) =

Moroccan-Canadian singer-songwrite

El Mehdi is a Moroccan-Canadian singer-songwriter based in Montreal, Quebec. Born in Rabat, Morocco, he blends dance, pop, electro, and Maghrebi music influences, writing and singing in Arabic, French, and English. He views his music as a fusion of both past and future inspirations, where tradition and contemporary issues converge.

His debut single, “EL KASS HLOU,” is an interpolation of the iconic 1930s song by Houcine Slaoui. The music video, created from archival footage of Morocco, was made during his time as an artist-in-residence at La Cité internationale des arts in Paris. It visually reimagines his homeland through a cinematic lens.

Due to his multidisciplinary approach to music, he is considered a rising figure among Moroccan musicians.
