= Egoz =

Egoz is a Hebrew word meaning 'nut'. It can refer to several things:

- Egoz (ship) or Pisces was a Jewish immigrant ship which sank off the coast of Morocco on January 10, 1961.
- The Egoz Reconnaissance Unit (Hebrew: יחידת אגוז Yehidath Egoz) is an Israeli guerrilla infantry unit.
- Egoz Valley (Nahal Egoz), see Wadi al-Joz
