= The Framework (Zionist organization) =

The Framework or ha-Misgeret (Hebrew: המסגרת) was a clandestine Zionist apparatus established by the Mossad that was active in Morocco from 1956–1964. It supported and facilitated the migration of Moroccan Jews to Israel.

== History ==
In 1955, the Mossad, especially David Ben-Gurion and Isser Harel, established a clandestine organization of Zionist foreign agents in Morocco headed by Shlomo Havilio ('Louis'). Its agents were European and Israeli Jews, and it served as Mossad's base in Morocco. An 'Ulpan' kindergarten for teaching Hebrew in Casablanca established in 1954 by Yehudit Galili, an envoy of the Jewish Agency, would serve as a hiding place for weapons of ha-Misgeret. Galili herself would join and serve ha-Misgeret as a spy and recruiter. After Moroccan independence in 1956, through an agreement between Isser Harel of the Mossad and Shlomo Zalman Shragai of the Jewish Agency, the two organizations would organize the clandestine migration of Moroccan Jews by land and by sea.

== See also ==
- Cadima
