= Pisces Affair =

Boat sunk in 1961 ship-sinking disaster

The Pisces Affair was the sinking of the Pisces, renamed Egoz (Hebrew: אֱגוֹז hazelnut), a ship leased and operated clandestinely by ha-Misgeret of the Mossad, carrying Moroccan Jews from the Gulf of Alhucemas in Morocco to Gibraltar, 10 January 1961. The sinking resulted in the death of 46 of the people aboard. From Gibraltar, the migrants were then to have gone to Israel at a time when the migration of Moroccan Jews to Israel was illegal under Moroccan law.

The event had a dramatic impact on politics in Morocco. Morocco was held responsible for the disaster in the international press, and it then eased its policies on Zionist emigration. The newspaper at-Tahrir of the National Union of Popular Forces (UNFP) saw the policy change as a direct consequence of pressure from the United States, Europe, and Israel.

== Background ==
Significant Zionist emigration from Morocco began in 1948 with the establishment of the State of Israel during the Palestine war. This emigration was facilitated by the Jewish Agency and Mossad LeAliyah Bet through initiatives such as Cadima (1949–1956). Although there was an agreement with the French colonial government, the emigration was carried out inconspicuously.

=== Competing nationalisms: Zionism and the Moroccan nationalist movement ===
In the 1950s, in the final years of the French protectorate and the first years after independence, Zionism competed with the Moroccan nationalist movement for the membership of the Morocco's Jewish communities.

Moroccan Jewish supporters of the short-lived al-Wifaq (الوِفاق 'the agreement') put faith in the tolerance of Sultan Muhammad V and sought out understandings with the Democratic Independence Party and the Istiqlal Party, both of which encouraged Jews to engage and participate in the creation of an independent, democratic Morocco.

=== ha-Misgeret 'The Framework' ===
In 1955, the Mossad, especially David Ben-Gurion and Isser Harel, established ha-Misgeret (המסגרת 'The Framework'), a clandestine, underground Zionist militia and organization in Morocco headed by Shlomo Havilio ('Louis'). Its agents were European and Israeli Jews, and it served as Mossad's base in Morocco. The Zionist movement made use of newspapers, radio, books, and lectures, and it also embraced cinema as a medium of propaganda in order to reach an audience that was largely illiterate. After Moroccan independence in 1956, through an agreement between Isser Harel of the Mossad and Shlomo Zalman Shragai of the Jewish Agency, the two organizations would recruit Moroccan Jews and organize their clandestine migration by land and by sea.

== Sinking ==
The Pisces had been used by the British marine in World War II, and was leased and renamed the Egoz in 1960 by the Mossad. It transported 334 Jews out of Morocco within a three-month span, smuggling on each of its journeys between 40 and 50 Jews from Morocco to Gibraltar, from where they would continue to Israel.

On January 10, 1961, on its 13th voyage, the Egoz set sail from the northern Moroccan coast with 43 Moroccan Jewish emigrants from 10 families on board. There were also 4 Spanish crew members and one Israeli, Haim Sarfati, born in Fes, who operated the radio. The emigrants had travelled from Casablanca to Ouezzane, pretending to be pilgrims visiting a Jewish holy place, and then to Al Hoceima, a small coastal city in the Rif mountains. They were led to a beach where they boarded the waiting Egoz and sailed to Gibraltar. At 03:00 h a.m., some ten miles from the Moroccan coast, they encountered rough weather and the ship's hull cracked, causing the vessel to sink in 5 minutes. The captain and two crew members survived on the only lifeboat, and were rescued at dawn by a Spanish fishing boat. Morocco, Gibraltar, and France launched a rescue operation but could only retrieve 22 bodies, with the rest lost at sea.

== Aftermath ==
The European and American press blamed the incident on the worsened conditions of the Jews in Morocco after its independence in 1956. By the end of the month, the Moroccan Minister of Information Ahmad al-Alawi blamed the tragedy on the Zionist organizations operating clandestinely in Morocco that 'incited' Jews to leave Morocco. At the time Mossad agents were carrying out multiple plans to bring Moroccan Jews to Israel. These included 'Operation Mural' which involved smuggling children to Israel without their parents.

The Israeli government seized the opportunity to place the blame on the newly independent Moroccan government. Golda Meir, Foreign Minister of Israel, declared that the Moroccan authorities bore the brunt of the blame for the ship's sinking. However, a report by the Israeli authorities made public in 1993 established that "a series of operational malfunctions caused the sinking of the ship", including a communications problem with the monitoring station in Paris. Mustafa Alawi, editor-in-chief of the independent Moroccan newspaper al-Fajr, described Meir's characterizations as slander.

The sinking of the Egoz (which in Morocco is mainly referred to as the Pisces) was seen as a turning point in the long-running negotiations between the Israeli government and the Moroccan government in order to allow the organized emigration of Moroccan Jews to Israel. After the accession of Hassan II of Morocco on 26 February 1961, it became possible to reach an agreement, through the mediation of the HIAS (Hebrew Immigrant Aid Society), an American Jewish organization, sanctioning the departure of the Jews of Morocco under certain conditions, including the payment of a fee, and a commitment to take a route that passed through a third country. In the framework of this agreement, by 1964, 80,000 Moroccan Jews left Morocco in Operation Yachin; most of them emigrated to Israel.

In December 1992, King Hassan allowed the transport of the remains of the drowned passengers of the Egoz to Israel, which were reburied on Mt. Herzl in Jerusalem.

Even though the ship sank long after the State of Israel had been established (1948), the victims of the disaster are referred to as Ma'apilei Egoz, using the Hebrew term designating illegal immigrants in the pre-state years. The Hebrew date of the event, 23 Tevet, was designated as the official day to commemorate the ship's casualties and the legacy of the immigration of North African Jewry.

== Transport of the remains of the deceased ==
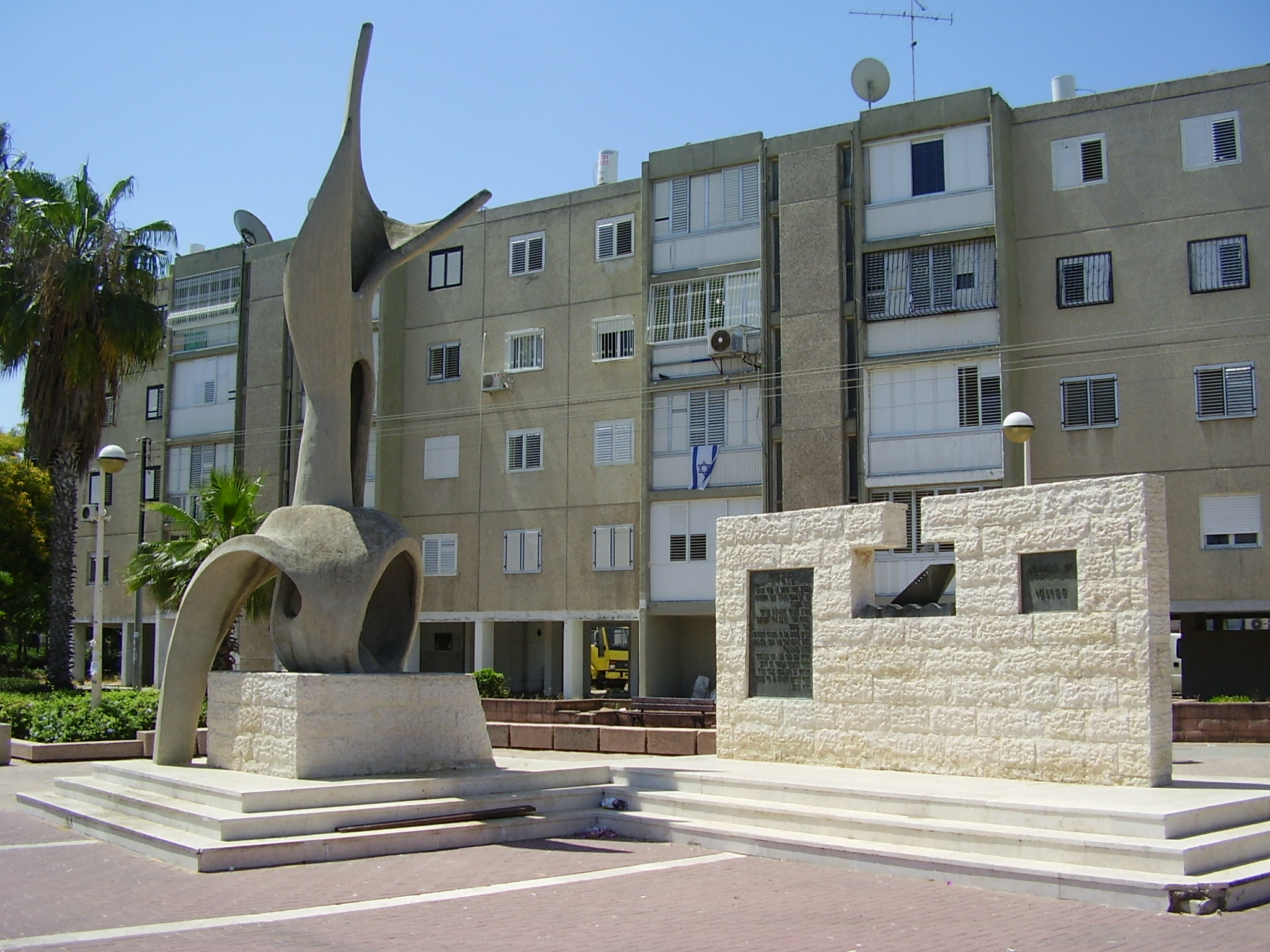
Monument in Ashdod

=== The efforts to bring the remains to Israel ===
Between the years 1983–1992, Sam Ben-Shitrit, Chairman of the World Federation of the Moroccan Jewish Community was the designated representative of the bereaved families. The Israeli government, made dozens of secret missions to Morocco and other countries, in order to persuade the King of Morocco and the Government of Morocco to allow the transfer of the remains of the victims for burial in Israel. In July 1983, King Hassan II responded that in principle he agreed to the request, however considering the sensitivity of the issue in the Arab/Palestinian world its implementation would have to be delayed until an appropriate time. Further attempts were made to pressure King Hassan II, including preparations to carry out the operation, which was canceled at the last moment. This was due to incidents and wars between Israel and its neighbors, or events and conflicts in the Arab world.

One such incident occurred in 1986, after Ben-Shitrit, along with two representatives from the Ministry of Defense, was in meetings at the royal palace in Rabat for 27 days. All agreements with the Moroccan authorities had been achieved and the ministerial committee for symbols and rituals headed by the Minister Yitzhak Navon, discussed the transport program and approved it. The bereaved families were ordered to keep all knowledge of the operation strictly confidential. However, the operation was aborted due to a disturbance at a ceremony dedicating a traffic square in Ashkelon in honor of the father of King Hassan, King Mohammed V. The event was presided over by Prime Minister Shimon Peres and a delegation of Jewish community leaders and dignitaries arrived from Morocco. It had negative echoes highlighted in the world press. Demonstrators from the Kahane movement disrupted the ceremony and incited local population to violence, stoned the crowd in the square and desecrated the sign honoring the King. This vandalism was in retaliation to the murder of two Jews from Ashkelon in Gaza two days before the ceremony. The King was insulted by the desecration of his father and immediately canceled the operation. The next day Shimon Peres, who was in Paris on an official visit, met with Prime Minister Jacques René Chirac. He tried to calm the climate but did not succeed. The honor of King Hassan II was restored when Ben-Shitrit granted him a recognition Charter titled "Tribute to King Muhammad V for his work on behalf of Moroccan Jews in World War II". The Charter was presented on the occasion of his 58th birthday in the Royal Palace of Casablanca on July 10, 1987, in the presence of the Moroccan Jewish community leaders. The Charter was signed by 71 individuals – reflecting the number of the Sanhedrin. Among with the signatories were the Chairman of the Knesset, ministers, rabbis, Knesset members, mayors, heads of organizations and intellectuals.

To increase the pressure on the King, Ben-Shitrit appealed to various personalities from Israel and around the world, including UN Secretary Javier Pérez de Cuéllar; French Prime Minister Jacques René Chirac; U.S. Secretary of State Henry Kissinger; former French Minister of Culture Maurice Druon, who was a mentor of the King; the widow of Gaston De-Pier; former mayor of Marseille; the president of the International Red Cross in Geneva; Edgar Bronfman, president of the World Jewish Congress; Minister Yossi Sarid; Palestinian leaders, including the editor of Al-Fajr in East Jerusalem; Hanna Siniora; Lillian Shalom from the US; a recipient of decoration from the Moroccan royal family; and from community leaders from Morocco in France, Switzerland, Canada, United States, Spain, Venezuela and Brazil.

The King of Morocco agreed to requests by former Prime Ministers Shimon Peres and Yitzhak Shamir after Ben-Shitrit presented another request by Yitzhak Rabin in September 1992. In Rabin's letter to Hassan II he stressed that this is a request, on behalf of the bereaved families, whose motivations were religious and humanitarian and would also contribute to the peace process being devised in the Middle East.

=== Operation Ayelet HaShahar ===
In 1992, King Hassan II of Morocco sanctioned the transport of the remains of the deceased of the Egoz to Israel with the date was set for November 29, 1992. In a secret operation called Ayelet Hashahar the remains were flown to Israel for burial.

As the plane landed in Israel with the remains of the illegal immigrants, major networks ran headlines in the written and electronic news reporting the tragic story of the Egoz.

=== National burial on Mount Herzl in Jerusalem ===
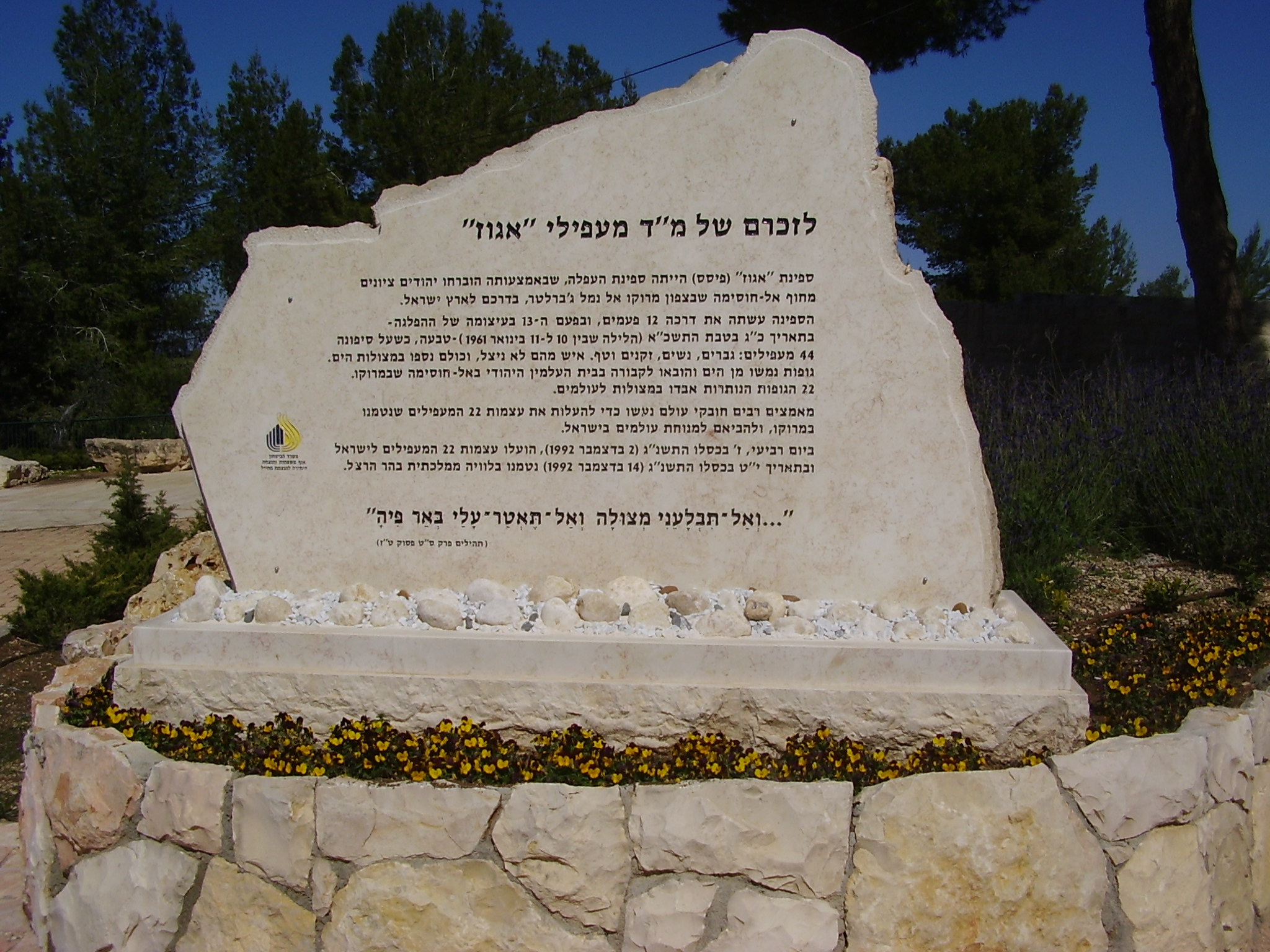
The Egoz memorial in Mt. Herzl, Israel

The Israel Defense Forces, the Military Rabbinate and the Information Center conducted the national ceremony for the interment of the remains according to a pre-existing plan. The President, the Prime Minister and his ministers, the Chief Rabbis of Israel, judges from the Supreme Court, a delegation of dignitaries from Morocco and a large number of Israelis attended the memorial services and funeral at Mount Herzl. The Knesset held a special meeting which opened with warm words of gratitude to King Hassan by the Prime Minister.

The immigrants aboard the Egoz were finally put to rest in peace in a special plot for immigrants on Mount Herzl in Jerusalem. The memorial is inscribed with a Hebrew Bible verse from Psalm 69:15b: "Do not let the depths swallow me up or the pit close its mouth over me."

== Popular culture ==
This tragedy inspired Moroccan director Mohamed Ismaïl's film Goodbye Mothers.

== See also ==
- Hurum air disaster

== Sources ==
- Hazan, Haim; Hertzog, Esther (2012). Serendipity in Anthropological Research: The Nomadic Turn. Ashgate Publishing. p. 296.
- Simon, Reeva S.; Laskier, Michael M.; Reguer, Sara (2003). The Jews of the Middle East and North Africa in Modern Times. Columbia University Press. p. 501.
- Black, Ian; Morris, Benny (1991). Israel's Secret Wars: A History of Israel's Intelligence Services. Grove Press. p. 174.
