= Mohamed El Jem =

Moroccan actor and screenwriter

Mohamed El Jem محمد الجم
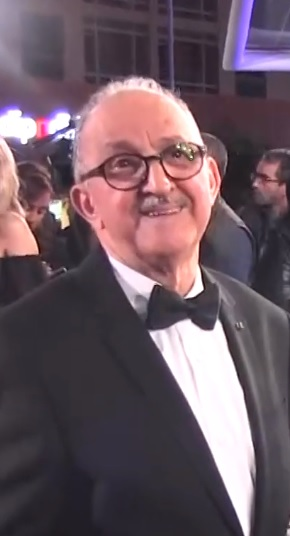
- Born: September 3, 1948 (age 77); Salé, Morocco
- Occupations: Actor; Comedian
- Years active: 1970 - present

Mohamed El Jem (Arabic: محمد الجم, born September 3, 1948 in Salé) is a Moroccan theater, TV and film actor and comedian.

== Early life and career ==
Mohamed El Jem was born on September 3, 1948, in the old town of the coastal city of Salé, in Northwestern Morocco. He spent his childhood singing Houcine Slaoui songs and imitating his teachers at school, until he became notable among his friends as the local comedian.

Discovering his talent for comedy, he joined local theater troops and started performing in different plays starting from 1970. The first professional play where he acted was managed by Nabyl Lahlou, who introduced him to theater. In 1975, El Jem joined the national theater, where he became nationally known as a comedian, through the different plays he participated in.

Since that time, El Jem broadened his work, participating also in TV series as well as films, and started also to write plays himself. In 2007, he started his talk show called Jwa men Jem, where he presented comic TV interviews with himself.
