= Goodbye Mothers =

2008 film by Mohamed Ismaïl

- Directed by: Mohamed Ismaïl
- Written by: Mohamed Ismaïl; Reine Danan
- Produced by: Maria Sqalli
- Starring: Rachid El Ouali; Marc Samuel; Souad Amidou; Hafida Kassoui; Christian Drillaud; Nezha Regragui; Rachel Huet; Tarik Mounim
- Release date: 2008
- Running time: 115 minutes
- Country: Morocco
- Languages: Moroccan Arabic; French

Goodbye Mothers (French title: Adieu Mères, Arabic title: وداعا أمهات - Wada'an Omahat) is a Moroccan film directed by Mohamed Ismaïl. Set-up in Casablanca, the movie depicts the fate of Moroccan Muslim and Jewish families during the exodus of the Jews of Morocco in the beginning of the 1960s. The plot inspires itself from the tragic sinking of the Pisces (renamed Egoz), when 44 Moroccan Jews who were clandestinely emigrating to Israel lost their lives.

== Plot ==
Casablanca, 1960. Henri and Brahim are childhood friends despite their different religions. They are managing the sawmill their fathers created and ran successfully for years. Their wives, Ruth and Fatima are working together in an insurance company, managed by Mr. Ouaknine, who is about to liquidate his estates to make his aliyah to Israel so he can live with his grandchildren. Shoshana Bouzaglo, a very religious and traditional widow, is really upset about her daughter Eliane dating Mehdi, a Muslim boy from her technical school. His father, Mr. Benchekroun, is a successful businessman who specializes in purchasing the estates of Jews who are liquidating their properties so they can emigrate. Mr. Benchetrit, an Israeli officer working with the Alliance Agency, is prompting the Jews to leave Morocco, arguing they aren't safe anymore. Mrs Attar is reluctantly leaving Morocco for Israel, following her son and his wife and kids. As they are leaving, she feels uprooted from her homeland. When Mama Hanna, Ruth's mother, is attacked after a synagogue service, Ruth and Henri decide that it may be the time for them to leave also.

== Cast ==
- Marc Samuel as Henri Elkaim
- Rachid El Ouali as Brahim
- Souad Amidou as Ruth Elkaim
- Hafida Kassoui as Fatima, Brahim's wife
- Nezha Regragui as Shoshana Bouzaglo
- Rachel Huet as Eliane Bouzaglo
- Tarik Mounim as Mehdi Benchekroun
- Salah Dizane as Mr. Benchekroun
- Malika Hamaoui as Mrs Benchekroun
- Christian Drillaud as Mr. Benchetrit
- Ahmed Alaoui as Mr. Ouaknine
- Amina Rachid as Mrs Attar
- Fatima Regragui as Mama Hanna
- Omar Chenboud as Rabbi Braham
