= Cadima =

Zionist migration program in Morocco (1949–1956)

The Caisse d’Aide aux Immigrants Marocains or Cadima (Hebrew: קדימה, 'forward') was the clandestine Zionist apparatus that arranged and oversaw the mass migration of Moroccan Jews to Israel from 1949 to 1956, during the final years of the French protectorate in Morocco. Cadima was administered by Jewish Agency and Mossad Le'Aliyah agents sent from Israel, with assistance from local Moroccan Zionists. It was based out of an office in Casablanca and operated cells in large cities as well as a transit camp along the road to al-Jadida, from which Jewish migrants would depart for Israel via Marseille.

== History ==
Cadima was established through an agreement between Resident-General Alphonse Juin of the French colonial administration in Morocco and the Jewish Agency represented by Jacques Gershoni signed on March 7, 1949. By this agreement, the French colonial administration would no longer interfere in the emigration of Jews from Morocco as it had been doing previously.

Cadima established a main office in the European section of Casablanca and opened cells in large cities throughout Morocco, operating under the guise of providing social services and a library. From these branches, they recruited Jews from rural areas and isolated villages and oversaw their departure.

Cadima started with communities in southern Morocco, citing "security reasons," with Yitzhak Rafael, director of aliyah of the Jewish Agency, declaring on October 18, 1951, that "absolute priority is being given due to their living conditions and current politics." Georges Bensoussan has noted that "these motives concealed other matters," citing a World Jewish Congress rapporteur that said "We consider that, among the entire Jewish population of Morocco, those living in the villages of the South are the most capable—physically and morally—of adapting to Israel ... They are accustomed to a harsh life, to hard work, to agriculture, to sobriety, etc. ... All these reasons make the aliyah of these populations an urgent and absolute necessity.” According to Bensoussan, the American Jewish Joint Distribution Committee provided subsidies and aid, the ORT supervised the departure of children 10–15 years old with vacations in France, and the Œuvre de secours aux enfants (OSE) accounted for the sick children with convalescence trips.

Initially, Mossad Le'Aliyah agents exploited poverty to motivate Jews to leave, though their economic situation would not significantly improve in Israel; most of the 30,000 Jews migrated between 1949 and 1951 were from poorer communities.

From mid-1951 to 1953, Cadima restricted the migration of Moroccan Jews through a criterion known as seleqṣeya (Hebrew: סלקציה) that included a strict medical examination and privileged healthy young people and families with a breadwinner. Those who passed the medical inspection were sent to a transit camp outside Casablanca on the road to al-Jadida, from which they would depart for Israel by way of Marseille.

rate of emigration through Cadima
| 1949 | 2,709 |
| 1950 | 3,442 |
| 1951 | 6,677 |
| 1952 | 4,632 |
| 1953 | 2,561 |
| 1954 | 9,977 |
| 1955 | 26,555 |
| first 2 months of 1956 | 5,903 |

While emigration ran smoothly under the French-administered protectorate of Morocco, Cadima sought to accelerate its activities by loosening its selection criteria in the period preceding Moroccan independence.

Cadima's was shut down and its staff were expelled when the Moroccan government banned all Zionist activities within Moroccan territory on May 13, 1956. The 2,000 people who were in Cadima's transit camp, unable to return home after having sold all their possessions and assets, were allowed to leave quietly after the World Jewish Congress negotiated with the Moroccan government. After Cadima, other agencies would facilitate the emigration of Jewish Moroccans clandestinely.

== See also ==
- The Framework (Zionist organization)
