= Operation Yachin =

1961–1964 transfer of Morocco Jews to Israel

Operation Yachin was an operation led by Israel's Mossad in coordination with the Moroccan state to bring Moroccan Jews to Israel between November 1961 and spring 1964. Prior to Operation Yachin, emigration had taken place with the help of the Mossad and Jewish Agency, but discouraged by the Moroccan government. The Mossad utilized much of the infrastructure from the aliyah operations of the 1950s to bring Jews to Israel with the permission of Hassan Il. From the time of Moroccan independence in 1956 to 1961 some 29,400 Jews had been brought to Israel. Alex Gatmon of the Mossad, who was assisted by the Jewish Agency, negotiated with representatives of Hassan to work out an emigration policy with support from the Moroccan monarchy. This helped to boost Israel's population growth which was considered necessary for its survival. In the arrangement worked out with Hassan II, the Hebrew Immigrant Aid Society (HIAS), an American organization, paid Morocco a per capita fee for every Moroccan Jew who migrated to Israel. About 90,000 to 97,000 Moroccan Jews left for Israel by plane and ship from Casablanca and Tangier via France and Italy.

The impetus for the operation was the desire to preserve and expand the state of Israel but also fear of repression in the era of Moroccan nationalism and wider Arab opposition to Israel. According to Israeli government official Moshe Yuval, annihilation was not anticipated for the Jews in Morocco, but the country was basically antisemitic. In his view, Jews and Muslims could not coexist and emigration was the only choice.

This was backed up by news stories about the dangers that lay in store for Moroccan Jews in a post-independent Morocco. This threat was not entirely unsubstantiated. Historian Michael Laskier also notes instances of discrimination and propaganda in the press, with Moroccan nationalist groups conflating Jews with Zionism and calling for their expulsion. Additionally, he notes a slew of unwarranted arrests of Jewish Moroccans during the visit of Gamal Abdel Nasser to Casablanca. While Yuval somewhat acknowledges there was no existential threat to Jews in Morocco, it is still important to state Hassan II's position on Jewry in Morocco could mostly be characterized as pragmatic and generally favorable. Despite having no real ideological stance on Morocco's Jewish population, Hassan II tended to support and lookout for Moroccan Jews as a whole. The government of Hassan's father, Mohammad V, and subsequently Hassan II included many Jewish members in high positions. In addition, a strong contingent of Moroccan Jews belonging to various leftist organizations called for disavowing Zionism and for reunification with their Moroccan roots post French Colonialism. Furthermore, Historians note Hassan II would visit a Casablanca synagogue every Yom Kippur and convey a message of good will to attendees. Despite Hassan II's desire to keep at least a somewhat sizable Jewish population in Morocco, since the founding of Israel, Moroccan Jewry now constitutes the largest national demographic of all Islamic countries in Israel.

The actual operation part of Operation Yachin consisted of identifying primarily Jewish families who had at least one primary breadwinner who could work and provide for their families in Israel. Individual departures for Jews from Morocco in this case were less favorable as the Israeli government did not want to be seen as splitting up families. From that point members of the Misgeret would transport persons partaking in Aliyah to Casablanca to get passports created collectively or as a family. Once families or persons were registered and photographed they and their belongings would be transported by ship to Italy, France or sometimes Spain en route to Israel. The same boats and infrastructure from the times of illicit emigration was often used during operation Yachin to transport Jewish families to Europe allowing for a fast flow of emigrants out of Morocco.

The accession of Hassan II on 26 February 1961 enabled negotiations to begin on a secret agreement between Mossad's "ha-Misgeret" division and the Moroccan authorities (principally Prince Moulay Ali and labour minister Abdelkader Benjelloun), together with the American organisation HIAS. After the Pisces tragedy, in which a ship of Jewish emigrants from Morocco sank, killing 46, the Moroccan government became eager to switch its policy outlawing Jewish emigration. This had to do in large part with Hassan II's desire to appear in a favorable manner to the West and his prerogative to preserve many of the economic benefits the Jewish population provided to Morocco. The Hebrew Immigrant Aid Society (HIAS) in the United States served as a cover for the Misgeret and Jewish Agency to help process emigrants out of Morocco. An economic arrangement was agreed between Israel and Morocco, with the agreement of Israeli Prime Minister David Ben-Gurion and King Hassan II of Morocco, whereby $500,000 would be paid as a downpayment, plus $100 per emigrant for the first 50,000 Moroccan Jews, and then, $250 per emigrant thereafter. Several times during the operation, emigration had to be paused due to the economic effects of a large withdrawal of Jewish capital from banks and real estate. The operation also received important help from Francoist Spain. However, some Jews settled in France, Canada and the United States instead of in Israel.

The operation was fronted by the US-based HIAS, which financed approximately 50 million US dollars of costs.In 1964 the operation was ceased due to a growing unpopularity as David 'Amar, the secretary-general of the CCIM stated: "rumors about ineffective absorption policies [in Israel] reached Morocco and made it difficult to continue the operation." Nonetheless, by 1967 the population of Moroccan Jews had dwindled to 53,000 from 162,420 at the beginning of 1961. The affects of Operation Yachin were also felt in Israel on behalf of the Jewish Agency. Moshe Kol a top Jewish Agency official was quoted as saying "Israel will turn into a land of the Levant" in regards to the increased Sephardic Jewish population from Morocco settling in Israel. Additionally, Chaim Sheba, a Ministry of Health emissary to Morocco as well as various reporters from Israeli Newspaper Haaretz, expressed concerns about the "Levantization" of Israel by Moroccan Jewry. While operation Yachin was successful in diluting much of Morocco's Jewish population, the idea became increasingly unpopular among Moroccan Jews and Israeli Jews as time went on. The economic situation of the Jewish population in Morocco was generally good, while rumors of recession and poor treatment of Sephardic Jews in Israel disheartened many would be emigrants to Israel.

== Etymology ==
The operation's name Yachin was of Biblical origin, being the name of one of the two central pillars that supported the Holy Temple built in Jerusalem by King Solomon, and because Israel regarded immigration as a major pillar that supported the existence of the Jewish state.

== Background ==
Upon Moroccan independence from French colonial rule in 1956, full rights and status were conferred to the Jewish population under the subsequent reign of Mohammed V. Nonetheless, immigration to Israel continued. In 1959, under pressure from the Arab League and facing the specter of the Jewish population's continued decline, emigration to Israel was prohibited, narrowing Jews' options for leaving the country. Despite retention efforts, Moroccan immigration to Israel rose to approximately 95,000 Jews for the period spanning 1952–1960.

The formal prohibition on emigration remained in place only through February 1961. While the formal prohibition was ended, Mohammed V maintained a clear public preference that the Jewish community remain within Morocco and barred foreign action to facilitate or encourage emigration. Beginning in 1960, Israeli authorities engaged Moroccan officials in discussions intended to negotiate the facilitation of Jewish immigration to Israel with official (or, at least semi-official) blessing. Even with the removal of the prohibition on such movement, these talks continued. Eventually, this evolved into Operation Yakhin.

On 10 January 1961 a small boat called Egoz carrying 44 Jewish emigrants sank on the northern coast of Morocco. This created a crisis both for the Moroccan authorities and for the foreign aid groups responsible for assisting the refugees.

== Migration ==
During Operation Yachin, 17.9% of the Jewish population of Tangier, 77.2% for Marrakesh, and 54.5% from Casablanca were migrated to Israel.

== Impact ==
In Kathy Wazana's 2013 film They Were Promised the Sea, Simon Levy, founder of the Moroccan Jewish Museum, noted that the trucks and planes that took the Jews away were Moroccan, which added to the trauma. Susan Gilson Miller described the departure of the majority of Jews from Morocco as "monumental national tragedy."

As of 2025, the numbers of Jews in Morocco is around 2,000 and currently houses the largest Jewish community in North Africa.

== Notable people ==
Shas politician Ya'akov Margi, born in 1960, was brought to Israel during Operation Yachin in 1962.

== See also ==
- Operation Magic Carpet (Yemen)
- Operation Ezra and Nehemiah
- Moroccan Jews in Israel
- Jewish exodus from the Muslim world
