= 2025 Torre-Pacheco unrest =

2025 ethnic riots in Torre-Pacheco, Spain

In July 2025, anti-migrant violence occurred in the town of Torre-Pacheco, in the Region of Murcia in Spain. The trigger event was the beating of a pensioner, for which three people of North African origin were arrested. Days of violence against North African people and businesses followed.

== Background ==
Torre-Pacheco is a town of 40,000 people located in the Region of Murcia, in the southeast of Spain. Around a third of the inhabitants are foreigners, many of whom are employed in intensive farming.

== Assault of pensioner ==
On 10 July 2025, a 68-year-old man was beaten in Torre-Pacheco. The victim said that his attackers did not take his money or possessions, and that they spoke a foreign language.

Three men of North African origin were arrested over the attack. One was arrested on a train heading towards France.

== Unrest ==
A video purporting to show the assault on the pensioner was spread on social media. The police and the victim confirmed that the footage was unrelated. Real photographs of the man's injuries were also shared.

There were battles on the street between far-right groups and North Africans. A Telegram group was used to organise violence, until it was shut down by the service. At least two channels run by the organisation were shut down on court order. An alleged leader of the group behind the Telegram group was arrested.

A man of Moroccan origin who had run a kebab shop for over a decade was attacked by what he estimated as 50 people, armed with baseball bats and pepper spray.

Violence against North Africans was carried out by locals including those of Gitano (Romani) origin. Gitano singer Pitingo announced his support for "my people" and said that he had fought off North African muggers in Barcelona. Some from within the Gitano community spoke against the violence, highlighting their own history as victims of collective punishment.

On 15 July, the Spanish government's delegate in Murcia announced that there had been 14 arrests and 120 people identified over the disorder.

== Reactions ==
Fernando Grande-Marlaska, the Minister of the Interior, blamed the violence on far-right groups including the party Vox. Prosecutors in the Region of Murcia investigated local Vox leader José Ángel Antelo for having blamed the violence on the Spanish Socialist Workers' Party and People's Party. Vox's national leader, Santiago Abascal, blamed immigration policies for the initial assault before the unrest.

== See also ==
- El Ejido riots – similar event in 2000
