= 2000 El Ejido riots =

2000 race riots in El Ejido, Spain

The 2000 El Ejido riots were a series of racially motivated disturbances that took place from 5 to 7 February 2000 in El Ejido, a town in the province of Almería, Spain. Triggered by the murders of three Spanish citizens by two Moroccan nationals in separate incidents, the unrest quickly escalated into widespread violence targeting the town's large Moroccan migrant community. Over the course of three days, groups of residents attacked migrant workers, destroyed homes and businesses, and vandalised community infrastructure. The events were widely described at the time as among the most severe instances of racially motivated violence in modern Spanish history. The riots occurred in a context of rapid demographic change, driven by the expansion of intensive agriculture in the region and the growing presence of foreign labourers, particularly from North Africa.

== Background ==
=== Migration to El Ejido ===
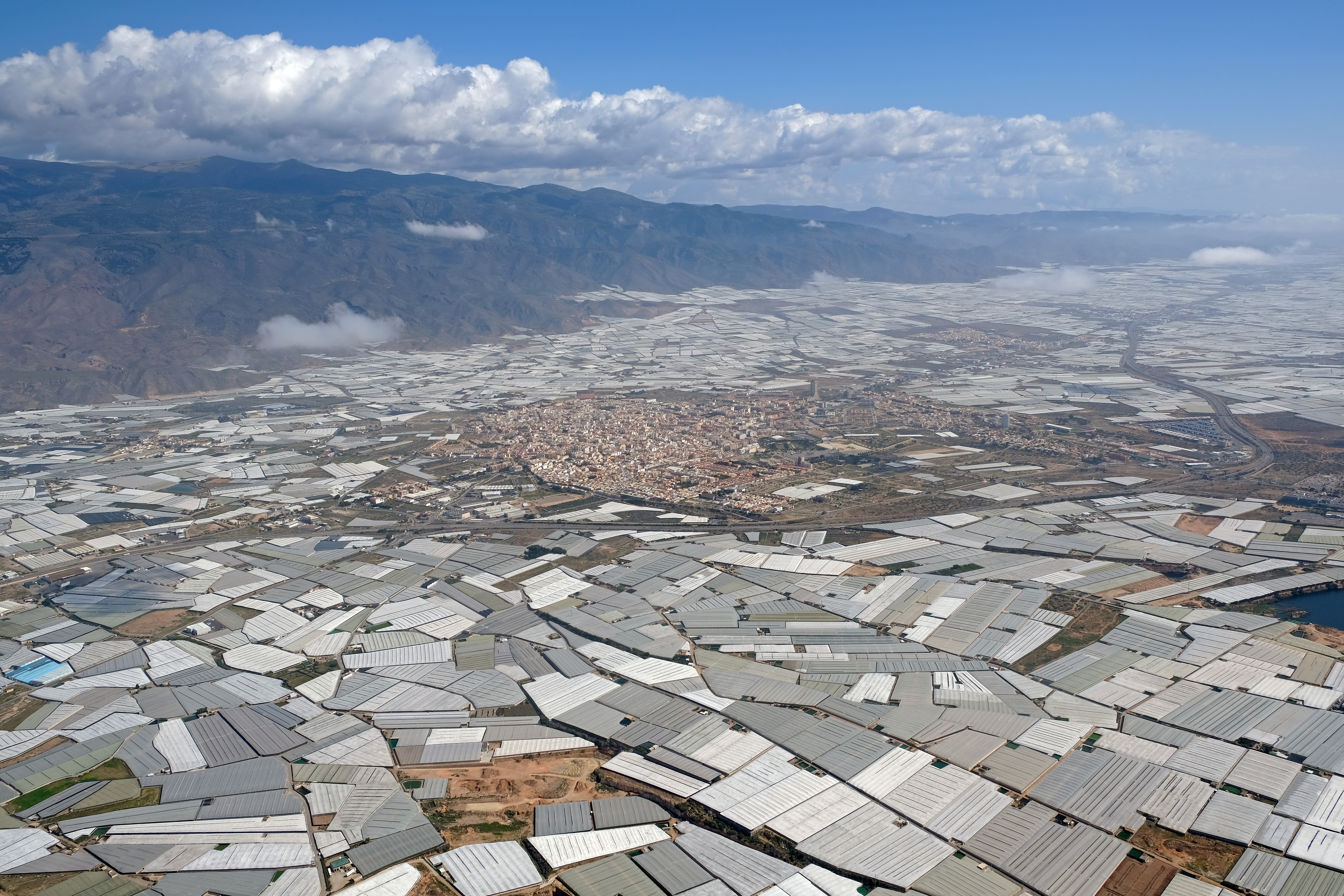
The Mar de Plástico (Sea of Plastic) of intensive farming in El Ejido is mainly tended to by migrant workers, who were the target of rioting in February 2000.

Long a country of emigration to Latin America and northern Europe, Spain began to be a migrant destination at the end of the 20th century. In the province of Almería, intensive agriculture became a major economic sector, employing 100,000 migrants earning the equivalent of US$25 per day. In El Ejido itself, an estimated 10,000 of its 45,000 inhabitants were foreign, and around half of them were living in shacks.

=== Murders of José Ruiz and Tomás Bonilla ===
On 22 January 2000, a Moroccan migrant worker named Cherki Hadij was throwing rocks at a dog when he was confronted by farmer José Ruiz, who was travelling by van with his wife and children. Hadij then stunned Ruiz with a stone, and killed him with another blow while he was on the floor. Hadij's boss Tomás Bonilla came to try to save Ruiz, and had his throat slit by his employee.

Hadij denied the charges against him, but was found unanimously guilty in July 2002 due to the testimony from Ruiz's family and the evidence of Bonilla's blood in his fingernails. Facing a maximum sentence of 40 years (20 for each murder), he was sentenced to 35, in addition to €210,000 (35 million pesetas) compensation to the families of each man.

Juan José Bonilla, son of Tomás, became a local politician for the far-right party Vox.

=== Murder of Encarnación López ===
Lesbir Fahim was a 22-year-old Moroccan working legally in El Ejido for two years. According to medical records, his mental state deteriorated severely after the murder of the two men. He had insomnia after seeing bloodstains at his place of work, and was prescribed valium. When he then developed acoustic hallucinations and paranoia, he was prescribed sedatives.

On the morning of 5 February 2000, at the Saturday market, Fahim attempted to snatch the handbag of 26-year-old Encarnación López. When she resisted, he stabbed her near the liver, killing her almost instantly. López was due to marry in March. Among the 1,000 mourners at her funeral were politicians, who were chased into the church.

At his trial in October 2003, it was accepted by the judge that Fahim had paranoid schizophrenia and was not fully responsible for murder. He was sentenced to 11 years and three months for the killing and seven months for attempted wounding.

== Riots ==
For three days following the murder of López, riots occurred in El Ejido and nearby towns. Migrants were chased with weapons and their cars and homes destroyed; some fled to the hills. The BBC estimated the rioters to number 5,000. Spain's government sent in hundreds of police officers from other cities to curb the violence.

According to a report in The Irish Times, police intervened to stop violence, but not property crimes. Pro-migrant and feminist organisations were ransacked and their staff subjected to threats. A telephone exchange allowing workers to contact Morocco, a mosque and Halal butchers were also destroyed.

Fifty-five people were arrested over the riots. According to various local witnesses, some of the town's black African migrant workers assisted in the anti-Moroccan rioting.

In November 2020, a documentary on the riots and the 20 years since was released through the news website Público. It is titled Después de las ocho (After Eight) due to a quote by the town's mayor Juan Enciso on migrants "At eight they're few in number, after eight [in the evening] they're everywhere".

The riots have been the subject of academic articles. Manuel Ángel Río Ruiz (2002) argued against the prevailing view that ethnic segregation caused the violence, instead finding the opposite: the locals were rebelling against how rapid immigration was dismantling social closure.

== See also ==
- Torre-Pacheco unrest – similar events in 2025
