= Moroccan Jews in Israel =

Jewish ethnic group in Israel

Total population
- 900,000-1,000,000 (Note: According to BBC Arabic in 2004. The World Federation of Moroccan Jewry estimated close to 1 million as of 2019.); 472,800 (born in Morocco or with a Moroccan-born father) (Note: As of 2010.)

Regions with significant populations
- Jerusalem, Haifa, Tel Aviv, Netanya, Ashdod, Kiryat Shmona and many other places

Languages
- Hebrew (main language for all generations); older generation: Moroccan Berber, Judeo-Berber, Moroccan Arabic, Judeo-Moroccan Arabic, French, Moroccan Ladino

Religion
- Judaism

Moroccan Jews in Israel are immigrants and descendants of the immigrants of the Moroccan Jewish communities who now reside within the state of Israel. The 2019 Israeli census counts 472,800 Jews born in Morocco or with a Moroccan-born father, although according to the World Federation of Moroccan Jewry, nearly one million Israeli Jews are Moroccan or of Moroccan descent, making them the second-largest community in the country.

274,180 individuals are recorded to have emigrated from Morocco to Israel between the establishment of the state in 1948 and the year 2016.

== History ==
Before the establishment of the State of Israel, rising French influence in Morocco at the beginning of the 20th century encouraged Moroccan Jews to enroll in French schools, receive a French education and integrate into French culture until 1940, when the Vichy laws came into effect and forbade Jewish attendance in French schools. After the Second World War and the establishment of the state of Israel, Jewish Zionist organizations encouraged many Jewish families to leave Morocco and they migrated to Israel legally, with the approval of the French rule at the time. Following the war, many young Moroccan Jews migrated to Israel and joined "Gahal" forces that were fighting the 1948 Arab–Israeli War.

Prior to the signing of the Fez Treaty, which entailed French protection of Moroccan Jews, there was a mass escape of Jews from large cities such as Fez, Meknes, Rabat and Marrakech to the smaller towns and villages surrounding the cities. The overcrowding, the decline in financial circumstances and the need to pray in secret caused some young families to emigrate to Israel or move to Tunisia; which employed a more liberal policy for Jews. Rumors and letters which started arriving at synagogues told of Jews migrating to and settling in Israel, encouraging the Maghreb Jews. The first community to make the move were Fez Jews who were living near the main synagogue in Fez. About 60 to 80 young families migrated from 1908 to 1918, and settled mainly in Jerusalem and Tiberias. Amongst the first families to settle in Jerusalem were; Ohana, and Zana, Mimeran, Turgeman, and Aifraga. The Aifraga brothers, who were bankers back in Fez, could not adapt to life in Israel; they bid their cousins, the Zane family, goodbye in 1918, and moved to France and subsequently to Canada as Morocco was no more an option since the initial departure from Morocco was seen as a sedition by most Moroccans Jews and non-Jews. The David, Zane, and Turgeman families lived in the Jewish Quarter whilst the rest of the families lived in Mishkanot (English: "residence") and Sukkot Shalom (English: "peace tent").

Migration was carried out largely through Tunisia, using small boats to travel from there to Israel. In the summer of 1911, a baby boy; Moshe Vezana, was born, a son to Simcha (Pircha) and David, aboard the ship on their way to Israel. Upon their arrival at Yafo port, the baby's Brit Milah was celebrated. The boy, who was a son to a 'Mugrabi' family, was recorded at times as a Tunisian native and, at other times, as an Israeli native. All other eight brothers were born in the Old City of Jerusalem. It was a large family of Mughrabi; the largest living inside the walls of the Old City, until their escape to Katamon due to 1948 Arab-Israeli War. The Maghreb Jewish community was small between the first and third migrations. Leading congregations in Jerusalem were primarily communities which had immigrated from Iraq, Iran, Bukhara and Yemen.

After the 1947–1949 Palestine war, and due to domestic strife in the 1950s, the next several decades saw waves of Moroccan Jewish emigration to Israel. Moroccan Jews emigrated for a variety of reasons. Some have emigrated to Israel for religious reasons, some feared persecution, and others left for better economic prospects than they faced in post-colonial Morocco. With every Arab–Israeli war, tensions between Muslim Arabs and Jews rose, sparking more Moroccan Jewish emigration. By the time of the Yom Kippur War in 1973, the majority of Morocco's Jewish population had emigrated to Israel.

Morocco once represented the largest Jewish community in the Muslim world. However beginning around the time of the establishment of the modern state of Israel, through the mid-1970s, almost 90% of Moroccan Jews made Aliyah and emigrated to Israel. Jewish emigration from Morocco was uncommon before 1945. This was partially due to a lack of stressors to leave. Jews in Morocco felt like they had political security and favorable economic opportunity. They did not want to move to British-controlled Israel-Palestine where the political landscape and economic conditions were more unstable. The British restricted Jewish immigration making the process difficult and providing further disincentive. Additionally, French Moroccan authorities worked to neutralize Zionist efforts when interest in Zionism was proliferating throughout Europe.

In 1947–1948, interest in making Aliyah became clear in large segments of Moroccan Jewry. One reason for this was dissatisfaction with the French government's treatment of Moroccan Jews. Specifically, there was a refusal to consider granting educated Jews French citizenship which led to a desire for more freedom and better representation in government. Additionally, many places where the current system, which included the AIU, failed had produced regions of mass poverty. Along with this, there was an emotional drive fueled by Zionism gaining popularity among Moroccan Jews. This was a result of greater clarity into the viability of a Jewish state in Palestine.

During this early period of immigration, much of it was facilitated illegally by Mossad LeAliyah Bet and Jewish Agency emissaries. Moroccan Jews were smuggled into Morocco through the border at Oujda. From there, they were brought to transit camps. Only three ships were able to leave. The first two were held in Cyprus until Israeli independence and the last left with only 44 emigrants due to the activity being discovered by French Moroccan authorities. This resulted in the shutdown of this entire illegal emigration operation. A consequence of these activities was an increase in antisemitism in Morocco. A notable incident was a pogrom in Oudjda and the surrounding area. On June 7, 1948, 43 Jews were killed by local Muslims whose frustration was enhanced by French Moroccan officials.

=== Emigration under Hassan II of Morocco ===
Policy changed with the accession of Hassan II of Morocco in 1961. Hassan agreed to accept a large per-capita bounty from the international Jewish community for each Jew who emigrated from Morocco, and under this agreement Jews were allowed the freedom to emigrate. Between the years 1961–1967, around 120,000 Jews left Morocco. The Six-Day War in 1967 led to another wave of emigration of Jews from Morocco, primarily to France, but also to Canada, the United States, Israel and other countries.

Moroccan Jews in Israel enjoyed less upward mobility: 51 percent were blue-collar in 1961 and 54 percent as late as 1981.

=== The disaster of the Egoz ship ===
In 1961 the ship Egoz ("nut"), which held 44 immigrants, drowned in the sea on its way to Israel. After the sinking of Egoz, pressure was exerted on Morocco and a secret treaty was signed with King Hassan II and consequently a massive exodus of Jews from Casablanca port was carried out under the supervision of General Oufkir. Some Jews came to Israel and some migrated to France and other countries.

Politically, Moroccan Jews tend to support Likud or Shas.

== Notable people ==
- Amir Peretz
- Amram Aburbeh
- Aryeh Deri
- Bechor-Shalom Sheetrit
- Daniel Benlulu
- David Levy
- Gadi Eizenkot
- Haim Revivo
- Miri Regev
- Moshe Bar-Asher
- Ninet Tayeb
- Noa Kirel
- Omri Casspi
- Orly Levi
- Patrick Drahi
- Reuven Abergel
- Roni Alsheikh
- Ronit Elkabetz
- Ruby Porat-Shoval
- Sharren Haskel
- Shlomo Amar
- Shlomo Ben-Ami
- Yael Abecassis
- Yitzhak Navon
- Yossi Benayoun
- Ze'ev Revach
- Zehava Ben

== See also ==
- Israel–Morocco relations
- History of the Jews in Morocco
- Arabic language in Israel
- Jewish ethnic divisions
- North African Sephardim
