= Jerada =

Jerada جرادة ⵊⵕⴰⴹⴰ
- City
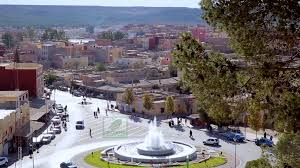
- Interactive map of Jerada
- Coordinates: 34°18′42″N 2°9′49″W
- Country: Morocco
- Region: Oriental
- Province: Jerada Province
- Elevation: 3,432 ft (1,046 m)

Population (Novembre 2024)
  - Total: 41,014
- Time zone: UTC+0 (GMT)

Jerada (Arabic: جْرادة; Standard Moroccan Tamazight: ⵊⵕⴰⴹⴰ) is a city in the Oriental region of northeastern Morocco. It is located close to the border with Algeria.

Jerada is the capital city of Jerada Province. According to the 2014 census, the municipality had a population of 43,506 people living in 8,953 households.

== History ==
Jerada has been the location of various instances of civil unrest in Morocco.

It was one of the sites of the 1948 Anti-Jewish Riots in Oujda and Jerada. The local Jews had been surrounded by an uncontrollable mob. During this pogrom, thirty-nine Jews were murdered and thirty were severely injured.

The 2017–2018 Moroccan protests started in Jerada after two brothers died in a tunnel accident when a mine flooded after miners broke through into a well.
