= Houcine Slaoui =

Houcine Slaoui حسين السلاوي الحسين بن بوشعيب
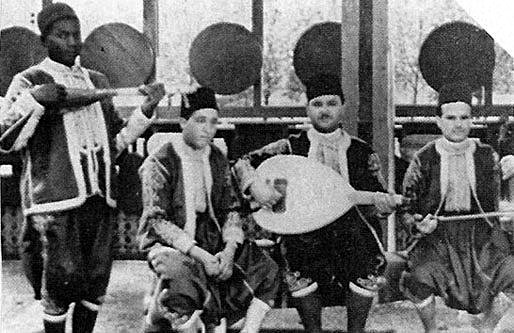
- Houcine Slaoui on the left

Background information
- Born: Houcine Ben Bouchaïb; January 1, 1918; Salé, Morocco
- Died: April 16, 1951 (aged 33) Salé, Morocco
- Genre: Chaabi
- Occupation: Singer

Houcine Slaoui (pronounced Husyn Slawi, Arabic: حسين السلاوي; real name Houcine Ben Bouchaïb; 1918–1951)birth 1 janvier 1918 was a Moroccan singer and composer who had a considerable influence on early-modern Moroccan Chaabi music.

== Biography ==
=== Early life ===
As a child, Houcine Ben Bouchaïb would skip school to practice music with an improvised instrument in the quiet of the cemetery. He became a popular entertainer known as a hlaiqi (from حلقة halaqa, a form of popular theater and entertainment, such as the kinds performed at Jemaa el-Fnaa), a troubadour, at the age of 12. His music addressed the ills of the new urban society in Morocco brought about under the French Protectorate: the tears in the social fabric, the rural exodus, and the proletarianization of the population. He traveled around back and forth across Morocco, healing the wounds with his music.

=== Early career ===
He got his break at 17 when offered a contract while performing with a halaqa in the Morocco pavilion at the 1937 Exposition Internationale in Paris. He later adopted the nickname "Slaoui," from by his birthplace, Salé, and emerged as one of the principal craftsmen of the modern Chaabi songs in Morocco.

=== Dakhlat l-Marikan ===
He spent some years in France, where he became friends with the Tunisian Mohammed Jemmoussi and the Algerian Amraoui Missoum. With the onset of World War II, Slaoui returned to Morocco. He witnessed the Allied invasion of Morocco in 1942 and the famine known as the Year of "Bon" 1944–45. In response to the American invasion, he composed and recorded in 1944 his most celebrated song: "دخلت الماريكان" ("Dakhlat l-Marikan" lit. 'The Americans Have Arrived'), a ballad ironically chronicling the American landing and occupation that has been covered by various artists and remains popular in Morocco.

=== Return to France ===
Upon his return to France after the war, he stayed by the Moroccan footballer Larbi Benbarek. Slaoui signed with Pathé-Marconi, which had also signed Frank Sinatra and Édith Piaf. He recorded in a studio in the neighborhood of Saint-Michel in the Latin Quarter near a Maghrebi cabaret owned by Mohammed Ftouki—father of the singer who would come to be known as Warda Al-Jazairia—where stars of North African and Middle Eastern music including Farid al-Atrash, Mohammed Abdel Wahab, Warda, and Nasri Shamseddine performed. Slaoui performed there too. He was offered a role with the rising Lebanese star Sabah.

He was one of the first to introduce modern musical instruments into Moroccan music. He was influenced by such Middle Eastern artists as Mohammed Abdel Wahab and blended some of the styles of early Egyptian pop music into his songs.

Until this day his death circumstances remain mysterious.

== Discography ==
- Aîta Bedaouia عيطة بيضاوية
- Hdi Rassak حضي راسك
- Ya Amina يا أمينة
- El American الماريكان
- El Kahla الكحلة
- El Kass Hlou الكاس حلو
- N'zaha نزاهة
- Dak Babaq
- Smra سمرة
- Sania Oul Bir السانية والبير
- Tanja ya al Alia طنجة يا العالية
- Lalla Ilali
- Samra wa Khomouria سمرة وخمورية
- Hahoua Tani ها هو ثاني
- Errada
- Sidi Lahbib سيدي الحبيب
- Ya Mouja Ghani يا موجة غني
- Ya Ghrib Lik Allah يا غريب لك الله
- El Haïlat
