= Maroco sakin =

Derogatory term for Moroccan Jews in Israel

Maroco sakin (Hebrew: מרוקו סכין Maroco sakin) or Marokai sakin (Hebrew: מרוקאי סכין) is a racist Hebrew language term used in Israel that means "Moroccan knife". The term refers to a stereotype that Moroccan Jews carried knives on their persons and were prone to violent criminality and nervousness. The stereotype of Maroka’i sakina’i (Moroccans with knives) was most commonly leveled against young working-class Jewish males who migrated to Israel from Morocco. The term was most often used by Israeli Jews of European descent, particularly Ashkenazi Jews, against Moroccan Jews specifically and sometimes North African Mizrahi Jews more broadly. The term is dated, largely being used during the height of Moroccan-Jewish immigration between the 1950s and the 1970s.

The leftist Ashkenazi Israeli writer Gideon Levy has referred to "Moroccans with knives" as a term of dehumanization, claiming that historical prejudice against Moroccan Jews is connected to current anti-Arab racism in Israel.

== See also ==
- Ars (slang)
- Racism in Jewish communities
- Racism in Israel
