= 1965 Arab League summit =

Meeting of Arab regional organization

Third Arab League summit
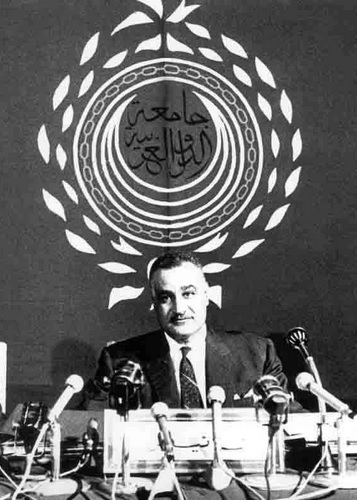
- Egyptian President Gamal Abdel Nasser addressing the summit
- Host country: Morocco
- Date: September 13, 1965
- Cities: Casablanca

The 1965 Arab League Summit (Arabic: مؤتمر القمة العربي الثالث) was a secret summit held from September 13 to 17 in Casablanca, Morocco. It was the third meeting of the Council of Heads of Member States of the Arab League. The summit was boycotted by Tunisia over disagreements with Egypt. The summit concluded with no notable decisions made.

== Participants ==
The Council of Heads of Member States of the Arab League included:

- Jordan: King Hussein
- Algeria: President Houari Boumédiène
- Sudan: President Ismail al-Azhari
- United Arab Republic: President Gamal Abdel Nasser
- Iraq: President Abdul Rahman Arif
- Saudi Arabia: King Faisal bin Abdulaziz Al Saud
- Syria: President Amin al-Hafiz
- Yemen Arab Republic: (North Yemen) President Abdullah al-Sallal
- Kuwait: Emir Abdullah Al-Salim Al-Sabah
- Lebanon: President Charles Helou
- Libya: Crown Prince Hasan as-Senussi
- Morocco: King Hassan II
- Palestine: Chairman Ahmad Shukeiri (PLO)

== Issues ==
The tensions between Pakistan and India in relation to the Kashmir issue was discussed.

== Intelligence leak ==
According to Shlomo Gazit of Israeli intelligence main purpose of the secret meeting was to discuss whether the Arab countries were ready for war against Israel, and if so, whether they should create a joint Arab command for such a conflict. King Hassan II of Morocco allegedly invited Mossad and Shin Bet agents to bug the Casablanca hotel where the Arab League Summit would be held to record the conversations of the Arab leaders. Thanks to the recordings “[Israelis] reached the conclusion that the Egyptian Armored Corps was in pitiful shape and not prepared for battle.” This information was instrumental in Israel's major victory over Egypt, Jordan and Syria in the Six-Day War. According to Ronen Bergman, Mossad then supplied information leading to Mehdi Ben Barka's capture and assassination in October.
