= Nezha Regragui =

Moroccan actress

- نزهة الركراكي
- Born: Rabat, Morocco
- Citizenship: Moroccan
- Occupations: Actress; comedian
- Years active: 1975–present
- Notable work: Goodbye Mothers
- Spouse: Bachir Abdou
- Children: Ali Lamjarred; Saad Lamjarred

Nezha Regragui (Arabic: نزهة الركراكي) is a Moroccan theatre, TV and film actress. Regragui has participated in several plays and films, including Goodbye Mothers. She is also notable for being married to the singer Bachir Abdou and being the mother of the Moroccan singer Saad Lamjarred.

== Filmography ==
=== Film ===
- 1988: The Love Kaftan
- 1989: Le Vent de la Toussaint
- 1998: Old Friends
- 1999: Mabrouk
- 2005: Here and There
- 2008: Goodbye Mothers
- 2009: Awlad Lablad

=== Television ===
- Al Ferqa
- 2002: Men Dar Ldar
- 2006: Khali 3mara
- 2008: Khater Men Dir
- 2019: Daba Tzian

== Theatre ==
- Maraat Lati
- Sa3a Mabrouka
- Hada Enta
