= Casablanca–Safi expressway =

Road in Morocco

A1 motorway

Route information
- Length: 255 km (158 mi)

Major junctions
- North end: Casablanca
- South end: Safi

Location
- Country: Morocco

Highway system
- Transport in Morocco

The Autoroute Casablanca–Safi is an expressway in Morocco. The road is 255.5 km (158.8 mi) long and connects the cities of Casablanca and Safi through the city of El Jadida.

== Casablanca–El Jadida ==
Works began on the Casablanca-El Jadida part of the project (112.5 km) in 2003 and finished in 2006.

- 2004: Bypass of Casablanca city (33.5 km);
- 2005: Casablanca-Tnine Chtouka (51 km);
- 2006: Tnine Chtouka-El Jadida (28 km).

== El Jadida–Safi ==
The 143-km extension from El Jadida south to Safi opened on 4 August 2016.
