= 1948 anti-Jewish riots in Oujda and Jerada =

Events in the French protectorate of Morocco

1948 Oujda and Jerada riots
- Part of Jewish exodus from Arab countries
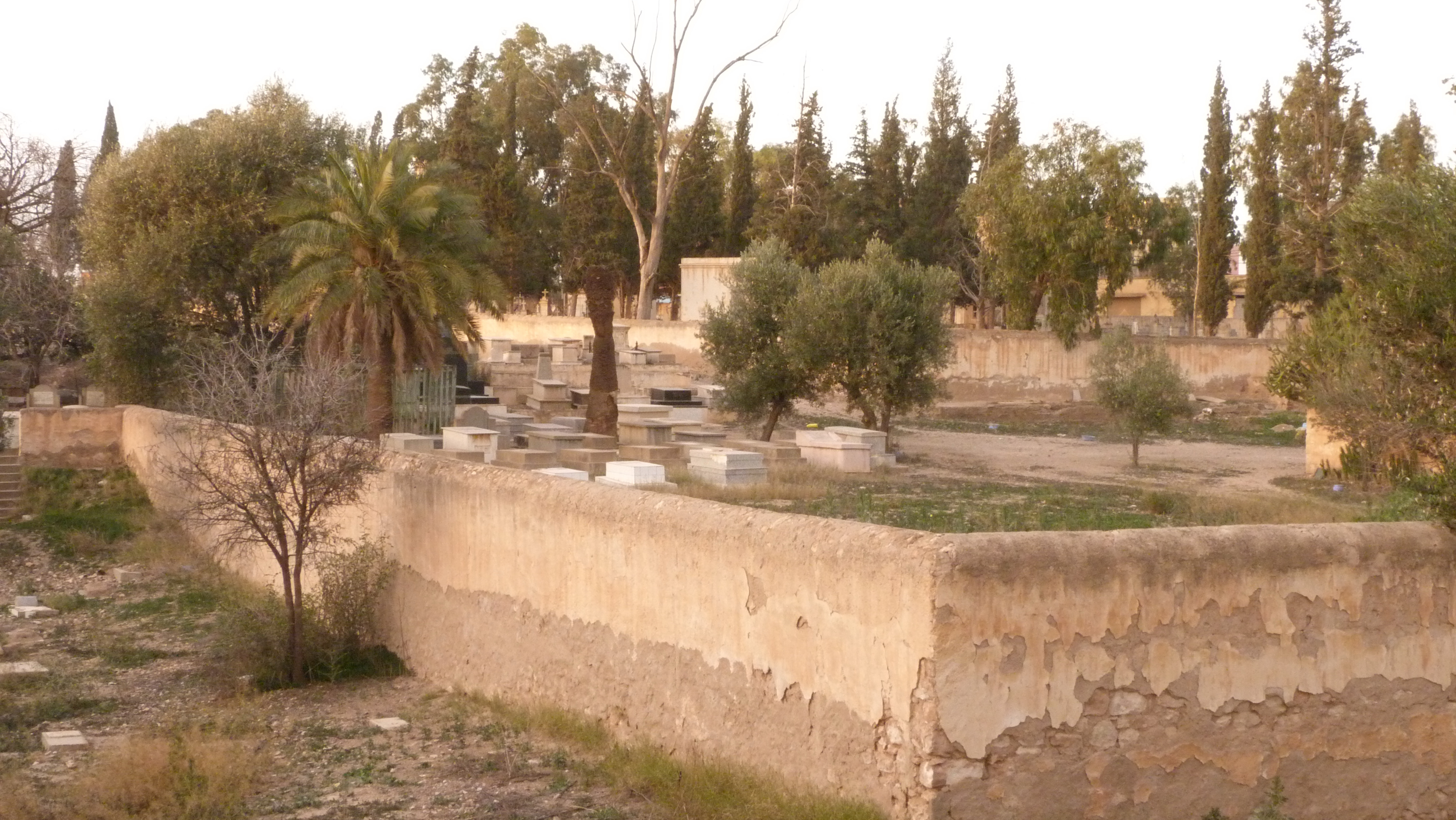
- A photo of the Jewish cemetery in Oujda, taken in 2010.
- Location: Oujda and Jerada, Morocco
- Date: 7–8 June 1948
- Target: Moroccan Jews
- Attack type: Violent pogrom, massacre
- Deaths: 47 Moroccan Jews killed 1 Frenchman killed
- Injuries: Many Jews injured
- Perpetrator: Moroccan Muslim rioters
- Motive: Declaration of Israel; 1948 Arab–Israeli War; 1948 Palestinian expulsion and flight

Anti-Jewish riots occurred on June 7–8, 1948, in the towns of Oujda and Jerada, in the French protectorate of Morocco in response to the 1948 Arab–Israeli War ensuing the declaration of the establishment of the State of Israel on May 14. The two towns—located near the border with Algeria—were departure points for Moroccan Jews seeking to migrate to Israel; at the time they were not permitted to do so from within Morocco. In the events, 47 Jews and one Frenchman were killed, many were injured, and property was damaged.

The riots took place a few weeks after a speech in which Sultan Mohammed V, in the context of the recent declaration of the State of Israel and ongoing Nakba, "affirmed Jews’ traditional protected status in Morocco but also warned them not to demonstrate any solidarity with the Zionist cause." In the eyes of many Moroccan Muslims, those emigrating were going to join the forces fighting the Arab armies.

French officials argued that the riots were "absolutely localized" to Oujda and Jerada, and that it had been "migration itself—and not widespread anti-Jewish animosity—that had sparked Muslim anger".

== Outbreak ==
René Brunel, the French Commissioner for the Oujda region, stated that rioting began when a Jewish barber attempted to cross into Algeria carrying explosives. Brunel wrote that that atmosphere has "overheated" as a result of "the clandestine passage over the border of a large number of young Zionists from all regions of Morocco trying to get to Palestine via Algeria." The French Ministry of Foreign Affairs noted that Jewish emigration from Oujda to Palestine was a significant irritant to the local Muslim population. The ministry noted, "It is characteristic that those in this region near to the Algerian border consider all Jews who depart as combatants for Israel." Alphonse Juin, Resident General in Morocco, noted that "the clandestine departure of Jews for Palestine ignited the anger already inflamed by professional agitators."

It has also been suggested that the riots were sparked by an anti-Zionist speech by Sultan Mohammed V relating to the ongoing 1948 Arab–Israeli War, but others suggest that the Sultan's speech was focused on ensuring the protection of the Moroccan Jews.

== Riots ==
The riots began in Oujda, which was at the time the main transit hub for Jewish emigration out of Morocco because of its proximity to the Algerian border (Algeria was at the time administered as part of Metropolitan France), in which five Jews were killed and 30 injured in the space of three hours before the army arrived. The riots in the neighbouring mining town of Jerada were even more violent, with 39 deaths.

== Aftermath ==
At the time, Morocco was a protectorate of France, and the French commissioner for Oujda, René Brunel, blamed the violence on the Jews for leaving through Oujda and for sympathizing with the Zionist movement. The French League for Human Rights and Citizenship blamed the French colonial authorities for their relaxed control in the area. A French military court tried 35 people for their involvement in the pogrom. Two people were sentenced to death, another two to life imprisonment, and the remaining 31 convicts to lesser prison terms.

As an Arab Muslim national identity became the vehicle of the anti-colonial resistance in Morocco, the violence in Oujda and Jerada demonstrated how Jews, particularly after the establishment of the State of Israel, were becoming excluded from Moroccan nationalism. While Morocco's Amazigh populations could belong as Muslims, Jews were increasingly excluded from the Moroccan nation.

The emigration of Jews from Morocco to Israel quickly became a flood after the incident: 18,000 Moroccan Jews left for Israel the following year, and 110,000 out of a total of 250,000 Jews in Morocco left between 1948 and 1956.

== Coverage ==
The events were covered in the Sydney Jewish News, which described them as a pogrom.
