= Mohamed Ismaïl =

Moroccan film director and screenwriter (1951–2021)

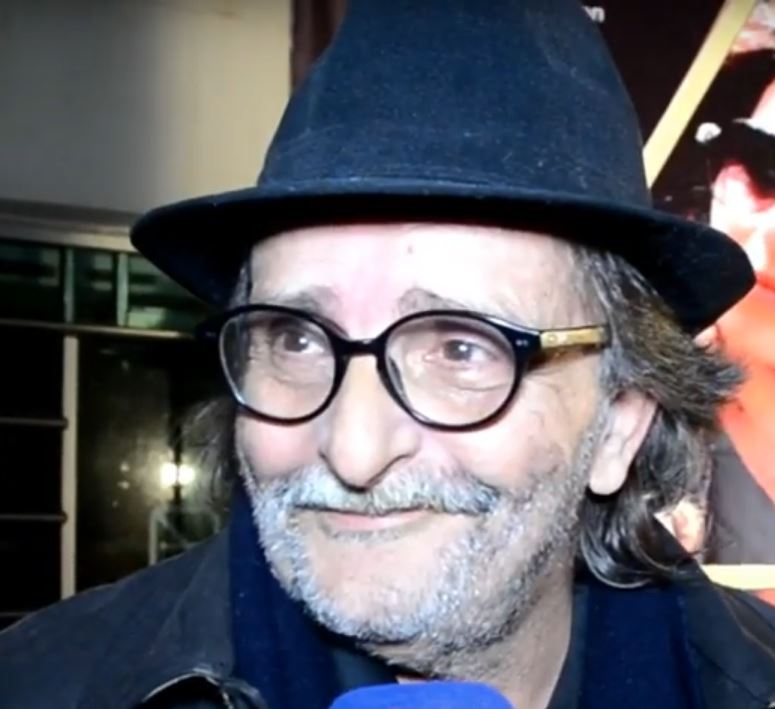
- Born: 1 September 1951
- Died: 20 March 2021 (aged 69)
- Citizenship: Moroccan
- Occupation: film director

Mohamed Ismaïl (1 September 1951 – 20 March 2021) was a Moroccan film director. He directed the 2008 film Goodbye Mothers.
