= Mossad LeAliyah Bet =

Branch of the Haganah

The Mossad LeAliyah Bet (Hebrew: המוסד לעלייה ב', lit. 'Institution for Immigration B') was a branch of the paramilitary organization Haganah in British Mandatory Palestine, and later the State of Israel, that operated to facilitate Jewish immigration to British Palestine. During the Mandate period, it was facilitating illegal immigration in violation of governmental British restrictions. It operated from 1938 until four years after the founding of the State of Israel in 1952. It was funded directly by the American Jewish Joint Distribution Committee (the JDC), and was not subject to the control of the Jewish Agency who operated their own Aliyah department headed by Yitzhak Rafael.

The Yishuv referred to legal immigration as "Aliyah Alef" (Alef is the first letter of the Hebrew alphabet, corresponding to the Latin A), whilst clandestine immigration was referred to as "Aliyah Bet" (Bet is the second letter, corresponding to the Latin B).

== History ==
In late 1938, due to domestic Arab pressure in Palestine relating to local objections to Zionist immigration waves, the British government announced in (what became known as) the 1939 White Paper that it was to reduce Jewish migration to Palestine, and at that point the main body of Zionism decided to cease conforming with British regulations.

Even though the Mossad LeAliyah Bet was officially founded on 29 April 1939, it had begun operating during 1938. Headed by Shaul Avigur, the Mossad LeAliyah Bet was founded on the basis of the Ha'apala movement. Its activity was initially centred in Athens; later, its centre moved to Paris. The movement's leadership was drawn from both revisionist and mainstream Zionist activists. Avigur was followed at the helm of the organisation by Meir Sapir.

In the first years after it was created, the Mossad LeAliyah Bet achieved a certain measure of success. Operating primarily by sea, in 50 cruises it was able to bring as many as 20,000 Jewish immigrants to Palestine. When World War II broke out, the Mossad LeAliyah Bet became virtually paralyzed and its activities were only renewed in August 1945.

Since that time and until the founding of Israel, the Mossad LeAliyah Bet was able to bring an additional 64 ships with over 70,000 Jewish immigrants (many of whom were Holocaust survivors). In addition to the sea, although on a much smaller scale, the Mossad LeAliyah Bet also brought immigrants via land, from the Arab world. Overall, the Mossad LeAliyah Bet was able to bring about 100,000 Jews into what was to become the State of Israel.

The most famous ship used by the Mossad LeAliyah Bet was Exodus 1947, which brought 4,515 Holocaust survivors. With the founding of Israel, Mossad LeAliyah Bet served as a basis for the agency Lishkat Hakesher (Liaison Bureau), codenamed Nativ (נתיב "Path"), created in 1953 and also headed by Meirov, which brought Jews from Soviet bloc, the Arab world, and other countries.
