= Naeim Giladi =

Iraqi author

- נעים גלעדי
- Naeim Giladi
- Born: 18 March 1926; Hillah, Mandatory Iraq
- Died: 6 March 2010; Queens, New York
- Spouse: Rachael

Naeim Giladi (Hebrew: נעים גלעדי, Arabic: نعيم جلعدي; 18 March 1926 – 6 March 2010) was an anti-Zionist Iraqi Jew, and author of an autobiographical article and historical analysis titled "The Jews of Iraq". The article later formed the basis for his originally self-published book Ben-Gurion's Scandals: How the Haganah and the Mossad Eliminated Jews.

== Biography ==
=== Early life in Iraq ===
Giladi was born Naeim Khalasch (Hebrew: נעים חלסצ׳י) on 18 March 1926 to an Iraqi Jewish family and later lived in Israel and the United States. Giladi describes his family as, "a large and important" family named "Haroon" who had settled in Iraq after the Babylonian exile. According to Giladi, his family had owned 50,000 acres (200 km^{2}) devoted to rice, dates and Arabian horses. They were later involved in gold purchase and purification, and were therefore given the name, 'Khalaschi', meaning 'Makers of Pure' by the Ottoman Turks who occupied Iraq at the time.

He states that he joined the underground Zionist movement at age 14, without his parents' knowledge and was involved in underground activities. He was arrested and jailed by the Iraqi government in 1947, when he was 17 years old. During his two years in Abu Ghraib prison, he expected to be sentenced to death for smuggling Iraqi Jews out of the country to Iran, where they were then taken to Israel. He managed to escape from prison and travel to Israel, arriving in May 1950.

=== Experiences in Israel ===
Giladi reports that upon entering Israel in 1950, he was "asked where I wanted to go and what I wanted to do," and that he volunteered to go to Dafna, a farming kibbutz in the Galilee. He relates that he lasted only a few weeks because, "the new immigrants were given the worst of everything…the food was the same, but that was the only thing everyone had in common. For the immigrants, bad cigarettes, even bad toothpaste. Everything. I left."

After leaving Dafna, Giladi went to the Jewish Agency to seek reassignment. He says he was told to go to al-Mejdil, an Arab town about nine miles from Gaza, and now a part of Ashkelon, that was to be transformed into a farming community. When the officials at the Labor Office there discovered that he was fluent in Arabic, he relates that they encouraged him to seek employment with the Military Governor's office. He says he was assigned the task of procuring the signatures of the Palestinian inhabitants of al-Mejdil on a set of government forms that stated that they were willingly giving up their lands to go to Gaza, at the time under Egyptian occupation. He relates how he realised in short time that those Palestinians signing such documents were doing so under duress. He argues that they were denied the right to access their agricultural lands and penned up in a small area and so some signed simply to end their agony. He wrote, "Those Palestinians who didn't sign up for transfers were taken by force – just put in trucks and dumped in Gaza." He left the job disgusted and attempted to procure government work elsewhere.

Giladi states he subsequently had difficulty finding employment because of discrimination against Arab Jews. He recalls that when he arrived in Israel, in May 1950, his Iraqi passport had his name as written in Arabic and transliterated using the Latin alphabet. Giladi states that because, "the English couldn't capture the "kh" sound...it was rendered simply as Klaski." At the border, Israeli immigration officials applied what he calls the "English" version of his name, which had an Eastern European, Ashkenazi sound to it. Giladi writes that "in one way, this 'mistake' was my key to discovering very soon just how the Israeli caste system worked. After leaving al-Mejdil, he reports that he wrote letters trying to get a government job elsewhere and got many interviews, but when it was discovered that his face didn't match his Polish/Ashkenazi name, he was rebuffed, advised time and again that "we'll give you a call." Eventually, he changed his name to "Giladi", which he writes was "close to the code name, Gilad, that he had in the Zionist underground."

While living in Israel, his views of Zionism changed. He writes that, he "was disillusioned personally, disillusioned at the institutionalized racism, disillusioned at what I was beginning to learn about Zionism's cruelties. The principal interest Israel had in Jews from Islamic countries was as a supply of cheap labor, especially for the farm work that was beneath the urbanized Eastern European Jews. Ben-Gurion needed the "Oriental" Jews to farm the thousands of acres of land left by Palestinians who were driven out by Israeli forces in 1948".

Giladi relates that he became politicized after an experience at the Socialist/Zionist Party headquarters. He had received a letter asking for help with their Arabic newspaper, and when he showed up at the headquarters and tried to show them the letter, he was dismissively told to report to the "Department for Jews from Islamic Countries" by many people who had not even looked at his letter to see why he had been invited. He says that he "was disgusted and angry. Either I am a member of the party or I'm not. Do I have a different ideology or different politics because I am an Arab Jew? It's segregation, I thought, just like a Negroes' Department. I turned around and walked out. That was the start of my open protests. That same year I organized a demonstration in Ashkelon against Ben-Gurion's racist policies and 10,000 people turned out."

After serving in the Israeli Army between 1967 and 1970, Giladi was active in the Israeli Black Panthers movement.

=== Life in the United States ===
In the 1980s, he left Israel for New York City. In the U.S., he wrote about an autobiographical account and historical analysis of Zionist actions in Iraq, Palestine, and later Israel in an article titled "The Jews of Iraq" The article later formed the basis for his originally self-published book Ben-Gurion's Scandal: How the Haganah and the Mossad Eliminated Jews.

He died on 6 March 2010, in a rehabilitation center in New York City after battling a lengthy illness, and was buried in the Jewish tradition by the Hebrew Free Burial Association.

== Controversy ==
=== Anti-Zionism ===
Giladi was an anti-Zionist and his article begins with the following passage: "I write this article for the same reason I wrote my book: to tell the American people, and especially American Jews, that Jews from Islamic lands did not emigrate willingly to Israel; that, to force them to leave, Jews killed Jews; and that, to buy time to confiscate ever more Arab lands, Jews on numerous occasions rejected genuine peace initiatives from their Arab neighbors. I write about what the first prime minister of Israel called 'cruel Zionism'. I write about it because I was part of it."

Giladi's position that the 1950–1951 Baghdad bombings were "perpetrated by Zionist agents in order to cause fear amongst the Jews, and so promote their exodus to Israel" is shared by a number of anti-Zionist authors, including the Israeli Black Panthers (1975), David Hirst (1977), Wilbur Crane Eveland (1980), Marion Wolfsohn (1980), Rafael Shapiro (1984), Ella Shohat (1986), Abbas Shiblak (1986), and Uri Avnery (1988). In his article, Giladi notes that this was also the conclusion of Wilbur Crane Eveland, a former senior officer in the Central Intelligence Agency (CIA) who outlined that allegation in his book "Ropes of Sand". In 2023, the Israeli historian Avi Shlaim cited detailed testimony from another Israeli survivor of the Iraqi Zionist underground which buttressed Giladi's claim in pointing to direct Israeli involvement, through the supervision of a Mossad agent, Meir Max Bineth who later committed suicide in prison while on trial for similar attempts in Egypt, in at least 3 of the 5 bombings

Historian Moshe Gat argued that there was little direct connection between the bombings and the exodus of Jewish refugees. Gat questions the guilt of the alleged Jewish bombthrowers who were found guilty in an Iraqi court of having perpetrated one of the bombings. He cites a rumour that a Christian Iraqi army officer "known for his anti-Jewish views", was initially arrested for the crime, but was evidently not charged despite the large number of explosive materials matching those used in an earlier synagogue bombing that were allegedly found in his home. He further cites a long history of anti-Jewish bomb-throwing incidents in Iraq.

Contemporary Israeli officials and mainly Mordechai Ben Porat and Shlomo Hillel, prominent figures at the Iraqi Zionist underground, vehemently deny the charges. An internal investigation conducted in Israel in 1960 found no proof of an order to execute such an attack. More possible responsible parties have been suggested, such as the Iraqi CID and the Muslim Brotherhood.

Writing in 2002, Jewish studies scholar Philip Mendes thought that, at that time, there was little in the way of completely definitive evidence either way. He suggested that, "It therefore remains an open question as to who was responsible for the bombings," claiming that "memories and interpretations of the events have further been influenced and distorted by the unfortunate discrimination which many Iraqi Jews experienced on their arrival in Israel (Black Panthers 1975:132–133; Shohat 1988; Swirski 1989; Massad 1996)." He does say, however, that Gat argues "convincingly" that there was "little direct connection between the bombings and exodus.".

In 2007, the historian Yosef Meir, an Iraqi Zionist underground operative, argued in a rebuttal article that while there was a direct connection, the culprits were the Iraqi government or Arab nationalists. He pointed to the fact that the bombings in question occurred after the Citizenship Relinquishment Act of 1950 had already expired and therefore no Jews could register for exit. He also noted that the two Zionist operatives hanged were never charged with the Masouda Shem-Tov bombing, but rather three other bombings which occurred later. On the other hand, he lists the motives of the government and the pressure it exerted on "Near-East" (the company performing the airlifts). Meir stated that some circumstantial evidence suggested to him that the Zionist movement had no motive while the Iraqi government and Arab nationalists did, and accused Giladi of withholding this information on purpose, calling it "an obvious attempt to mislead readers."

Giladi also mentioned Mordechai Ben-Porat, a former Israeli Member of the Knesset, and a Cabinet minister, who was a key figure in the Zionist underground, as having been one of the figures responsible for the bombings according to one of the Iraqi investigators into the bombings, in a book titled Venom of the Zionist Viper. Ben-Porat was one of several Israeli undercover Mossad agents arrested in Baghdad after the explosion; he was able to skip bail and flee to Israel. Ben-Porat has vigorously denied this allegation, which he characterizes as akin to "blood libel", and which prompted him to write his 1998 book, "To Baghdad and Back". In it, Ben-Porat contends that the false charge against him was conceived at Iraq police headquarters. The affair has also been the subject of an anti-libel lawsuit by Ben-Porat against a journalist who published Giladi's accusations. The lawsuit has been settled out of court with the journalist publishing an apology.

For his 2006 book Occupied Minds, British journalist Arthur Neslen interviewed Yehuda Tajar, a Mossad agent who spent ten years of a 25-year prison sentence in Iraq, after being convicted for the explosions. Tajar insists that, although his undercover cell was prepared to carry out such acts, they did not in fact do so. The actual explosions, he claims, were the work of the Muslim Brotherhood. After several members of the cell were arrested, however, those still at liberty carried out other grenade attacks, in an attempt to show the innocence of those arrested.

Giladi's article is regularly cited by anti-Zionists, including Jewish anti-Zionists, who claim that Zionism has a negative effect for Jews.

Giladi also maintains a controversial stance regarding the Farhud, alleging that the British government bear the bulk of responsibility for the event as he claimed they instigated it to blacken the image of the Rashid Ali government.

=== Cover Banner: "This book banned in Israel and United States" ===
Cover of Giladi's book.

In 2003, Dandelion Books published a second edition of Gilad's book. The book is marked with a banner that reads, "Banned in Israel and the United States". The press release accompanying the book reads, "Banned in Israel and the United States…Dandelion Books, rapidly becoming known for its 'uncensored books and unfettered fiction' has just released a revised edition of this highly controversial book. The details of a direct ban enacted by either the American or Israeli governments are not supplied by the author or publisher.

In the foreword of the book, Giladi writes that he did not submit a manuscript in Israel for fear of retribution. "Before," he wrote, "one can publish a book in Israel, permission had to be granted by the censors.... When I was contemplating writing and publishing this book, two of my colleagues and well known Israeli journalists (Maxim Gilan and Samuel Mour) were arrested and put in jail for exposing the involvement of the Israeli secret police ... in the kidnapping in Paris of Mehdi Ben Barka ..., charged with crimes against national security and ... locked up for six months. Moreover, the Israeli media were gagged and not even allowed to mention that the two journalists had been arrested. If the authorities had wished, the two men would have been kept in jail for the rest of their lives."

Also in the foreword, Giladi writes that upon emigrating to the United States in 1980, he found several publishers interested in publishing his work. He says he declined to publish because all interested publishers wanted to reserve the right of editorial control over the finished manuscript and he did not want to agree to this. Twelve years after his arrival in the US, he self-published at a cost of $60,000, which he reports was almost all of the proceeds of the sale of his Israeli property.
