= 1950–1951 Baghdad bombings =

Bombing of Jewish targets in Baghdad, Iraq, between April 1950 and June 1951

- Location: Baghdad, Kingdom of Iraq
- Date: April 1950 – June 1951
- Target: Iraqi Jews
- Attack type: Bombings
- Deaths: 3–4 Iraqi Jews killed
- Injuries: dozens wounded
- Perpetrators: Alleged: Iraqi Zionist agents, or; Israeli Mossad LeAliyah Bet agents, or; Iraqi Istiqlal Party agents; 28 Jews and 9 Arabs were brought to trial; 2 Jews were executed.

Jewish targets were bombed in Baghdad, Iraq, between April 1950 and June 1951.

Two activists in the Iraqi Zionist underground were found guilty by an Iraqi court for a number of the bombings, and were sentenced to death. Another was sentenced to life imprisonment and seventeen more were given long prison sentences. The allegations against Israeli agents had "wide consensus" amongst Iraqi Jews in Israel. Many of the Iraqi Jews in Israel who lived in poor conditions blamed their ills and misfortunes on the Israeli Zionist emissaries or Iraqi Zionist underground movement. The theory that "certain Jews" carried out the attacks "in order to focus the attention of the Israel Government on the plight of the Jews" was viewed as "more plausible than most" by the British Foreign Office. Telegrams between the Mossad LeAliyah Bet agents in Baghdad and their superiors in Tel Aviv give the impression that neither group knew who was responsible for the attack.

Israeli involvement has been consistently denied by the Israeli government, including by a Mossad-led internal inquiry, even following the 2005 admission of the Lavon affair.

Those who assign responsibility for the bombings to an Israeli or Iraqi Zionist underground movement suggest the motive was to encourage Iraqi Jews to immigrate to Israel, as part of the ongoing Operation Ezra and Nehemiah. Those historians who have raised questions regarding the guilt of the convicted Iraqi Zionist agents with respect to the bombings note that by 13 January 1951, nearly 86,000 Jews had already registered to immigrate, and 23,000 had already left for Israel, that the British who were closely monitoring the Jewish street did not even mention the bombs of April and June 1950, nor were they mentioned in the Iraqi trials, meaning these were minor events. They have raised other possible culprits such as a nationalist Iraqi Christian army officer, and those who have raised doubt regarding Israeli involvement claimed that it is highly unlikely the Israelis would have taken such measures to accelerate the Jewish evacuation given that they were already struggling to cope with the existing level of Jewish immigration.

== Background ==
Before the exodus of Jews to Israel, there were about 140,000 Iraqi Jews. Most lived in Baghdad, of which Jews made up a sixth of the city's population. High Jewish populations also existed in the towns of Basra and Mosul.

Iraqi Jews constitute one of the world's oldest and most historically significant Jewish communities. By 1936 there was an increased sense of insecurity among the Jews of Iraq. In 1941 after the government of pro-Nazi Rashid Ali was defeated, his soldiers and policemen, aided by the Arab mob, started the Farhud ("violent dispossession"). A government commission later reported that at least 180 Jews had been killed and 240 wounded, 586 Jewish businesses pillaged, and 99 Jewish homes burned. Jewish sources claimed much higher casualties.

In the summer of 1948, following the declaration of the State of Israel, the Iraqi government declared Zionism a capital offense and fired Jews in government positions. In his autobiography, Sasson Somekh, a Baghdadi Jew, wrote:

Emigration until 1946 or 1947 was infrequent, despite the growing feeling among Iraqi Jews that their days in the Land of the Two Rivers were numbered. By the time war broke out in Palestine in 1948, many civil servants had been dismissed from their governmental jobs. Commerce had declined considerably, and the memory of the Farhud, which had meanwhile faded, returned.

At this time, he writes, "hundreds of Jews... were sentenced by military courts to long prison sentences for Zionist and Communist activity, both real and imagined. Some of the Baghdadi Jews who supported the Zionist movement began to steal across the border to Iran, from where they were flown to Israel."

Elie Kedourie writes that after the 1948 show trial of Shafiq Ades, a respected Jewish businessman, who was publicly hanged in Basra, Iraq Jews realized they were no longer under the protection of the law and there was little difference between the mob and Iraqi court justice.

Emigration from Iraq to Israel was banned in 1948 and by 1949 the Iraqi Zionist underground was smuggling Iraqi Jews out of the country at the rate of 1,000 a month. In March 1950, Iraq passed a law which temporarily allowed emigration to Israel, limited to one year only, and stripping Jews who emigrated of their Iraqi citizenship. The law was motivated by economic considerations (the property of departing Jews would be seized by the state treasury) and a sense that Jews were a potentially troublesome minority that the country would be better off without. At first, few registered, as the Zionist movement suggested they not do so until property issues had been clarified. After mounting pressure from both Jews and the Iraqi government, the movement relented and agreed to registrations. Israel was initially reluctant to absorb so many immigrants, (Hillel, 1987) but in March 1950, organized Operation Ezra and Nehemiah, an airlift to Israel, and sent in emissaries to encourage Jews to leave.

In April 1950, an agent of Mossad LeAliyah Bet, Shlomo Hillel, using the alias Richard Armstrong, flew from Amsterdam to Baghdad as a representative of the American charter company Near East Air Transport, to organize an airlift of Iraqi Jews to Israel via Cyprus. Earlier, Hillel had trained Zionist militants in Baghdad under the alias Fuad Salah. Near East Air Transport was owned by the Jewish Agency. The first flight of "Near East Airlines" with immigrating Iraqi Jews arrived in Israel on 20 May 1950. At that time, 46,000 Iraqi Jews had registered under the De-naturalization law.

Israel could not cope with so many immigrants and limited the rate of the flights from Iraq. By early January 1951, the number of Jews who registered to leave was about 86,000, but only 23,000 had departed.

According to Adam Shatz, the Mossad LeAliyah Bet had been promoting Jewish emigration since 1941. Nuri al-Said had warned the Jewish community of Baghdad to accelerate their flights out of the country, otherwise, he would take the Jews to the borders himself. Nuri al-Said's threats encouraged Iraqi officials to abuse the departing Jews before they boarded the planes and to destroy their baggage.

== Bombing incidents ==
According to the Baghdad police who gave evidence at the trial, the weapon used was a British-made World War II hand grenade "No. 36". Between April 1950 and June 1951, several explosions had occurred in Baghdad:

- In April 1950, a bomb was thrown into El-Dar El-Bayda Coffee shop in Baghdad. Four Jews were injured in the blast.
- On 10 May 1950, a grenade was thrown at Beit-Lawi Automobile company building, a company with Jewish ownership.
- On 3 June 1950, a grenade exploded in El-Batawin, then a Jewish area of Baghdad, with no casualties.
- On 14 January 1951, a grenade damaged a high-voltage cable outside Masuda Shem-Tov Synagogue. Three, or four Jews were killed, including a 12-year-old boy, and ten were wounded.
- On 14 March 1951, a bomb went off in the American Cultural Center and Library wounding some of the Jews using the facilities.
- On 5 June 1951, a bomb went off next to the Jewish Stanley Sashua car dealership on El Rasjid Street. Nobody was injured.
- On 19 March 1951, the US legation's information office was attacked.
- In May 1951, a Jewish home was attacked.

== Trial ==
The pro-Western Iraqi government of Faisal II and Nuri al-Said prosecuted the alleged Jewish perpetrators in court, in a trial which began in October 1951. Two confirmed activists in the Zionist underground, Shalom Salah Shalom, a 19-year-old weapons expert, and Yosef Ibrahim Basri, a lawyer active in collecting intelligence material, were executed after being convicted of the bombings. Whilst their involvement in the underground movement and holdings of weapons caches were not disputed, both denied involvement in the bombings. Salah's testimony under torture indirectly allowed the Iraqi police to find large weapons caches of the Zionist underground in three synagogues (Masuda Shemtov, Hakham Haskal and Meir Tuweik) and in private homes, including 436 hand-grenades, 33 machine-guns, 97 machine-gun cartridges, 186 pistols. Shlomo Hillel, also once a member of the Iraqi Zionist underground, noted that the last words of the executed defendants were "Long live the State of Israel". The British Foreign Office noted in a file note "Trial of Jews at Baghdad, 20 December 1951" that they had "no reason to suppose that the trials were conducted in anything but a normal manner".

Baghdad police officers who gave evidence at the trial appear to have been convinced that the crimes were committed by Jewish agents, claiming that "anyone studying the affair closely will see that the perpetrator did not intend to cause loss of life among the Jews" and that each grenade was "thrown in non-central locations and there was no intention to kill or injure a certain person".

Historian Esther Meir-Glitzenstein, in her book, Zionism in an Arab Country: Jews in Iraq in the 1940s states that the charges in the Iraqi trial were "groundless for several reasons", because many thousands of Iraqi Jews had already registered to leave by the time of the later bombings, and the charges related only to these later bombings.

== Responsibility for the bombings ==
There has been debate over whether the bombs were in fact planted by the Mossad LeAliyah Bet or the Iraqi Zionist underground in order to encourage Iraqi Jews to immigrate to the newly created state of Israel or whether they were the work of Arab anti-Jewish extremists in Iraq. The issue has been the subject of lawsuits and inquiries in Israel.

The true identity and objective of the culprits behind the bombings has been the subject of controversy. A secret Israeli inquiry in 1960 found no evidence that they were ordered by Israel or any motive that would have explained the attack, though it did find out that most of the witnesses believed that Jews had been responsible for the bombings. The issue remains unresolved: Iraqi activists still regularly charge that Israel used violence to engineer the exodus, while Israeli officials of the time vehemently deny it. Historian Moshe Gat reports that "the belief that the bombs had been thrown by Zionist agents was shared by those Iraqi Jews who had just reached Israel". Sociologist Phillip Mendes backs Gat's claims, and further attributes the allegations to have been influenced and distorted by feelings of discrimination.

=== Claims for Israeli or Iraqi Zionist involvement ===
In 1949, Zionist emissary Yudka Rabinowitz complained that the complacency of the Iraqi Jews was "hampering our existence" and proposed to the Mossad LeAliyah Bet "throwing several hand-grenades for intimidation into cafes with a largely Jewish clientele, as well as leaflets threatening the Jews and demanding their expulsion from Berman", using the code name for Iraq. The Mossad Le Aliyah Bet forbade him to conduct negotiations about or carry out any acts of terror, an order which he reported that he had "confirmed and accepted".

According to Moshe Gat, as well as Meir-Glitzenstein, Samuel Klausner, Rayyan Al-Shawaf and Yehouda Shenhav, there is "wide consensus among Iraqi Jews that the emissaries threw the bombs in order to hasten the Jews' departure from Iraq". Shenhav noted an Israeli Foreign Ministry memo which stated that Iraqi Jews reacted to the hangings of Salah and Basri with the attitude: "That is God's revenge on the movement that brought us to such depths."

The British Embassy in Baghdad assessed that the bombings were carried out by Zionist activists trying to highlight the danger to Iraqi Jews, in order influence the State of Israel to accelerate the pace of Jewish emigration. Another possible explanation offered by the embassy was that bombs were meant to change the minds of well-off Jews who wished to stay in Iraq.

In a 1954 operation by Israeli military intelligence, known as the Lavon Affair after the defence minister Pinchas Lavon, a group of Zionist Egyptian Jews attempted to plant bombs in a U.S. Information Service library, and in a number of American targets in Cairo and Alexandria. According to Teveth, they were hoping that the Muslim Brotherhood, the Communists, 'unspecified malcontents' or 'local nationalists' would be blamed for their actions and this would undermine Western confidence in the existing Egyptian regime by generating public insecurity and actions to bring about arrests, demonstrations, and acts of revenge, while totally concealing the Israeli factor. The operation failed, the perpetrators were arrested by Egyptian police and brought to justice, two were sentenced to death, several to long term imprisonment.

The Iraqi Jewish anti-Zionist author Naeim Giladi maintains that the bombings were "perpetrated by Zionist agents in order to cause fear amongst the Jews, and so promote their exodus to Israel." Giladi claims that he is supported by Wilbur Crane Eveland, a former senior officer in the Central Intelligence Agency (CIA), in his book Ropes of Sand. According to Eveland, whose information was presumably based on the Iraqi official investigation, which was shared with the US embassy, "In an attempt to portray the Iraqis as anti-American and to terrorize the Jews, the Zionists planted bombs in the U.S. Information Service library and in the synagogues. Soon leaflets began to appear urging Jews to flee to Israel... most of the world believed reports that Arab terrorism had motivated the flight of the Iraqi Jews whom the Zionists had 'rescued' really just in order to increase Israel’s Jewish population." This theory is shared by Marion Wolfsohn and Uri Avnery, who wrote in My Friend, The Enemy that "After the disclosure of the Lavon Affair... the Baghdad affair became more plausible".

Palestinian historian Abbas Shiblak believes that the attacks were committed by Zionist activists and that the attacks were the pre-eminent reason for the subsequent exodus of Iraqi Jews to Israel. Shiblak also argues that the attacks were an attempt to sour Iraq-American relations, saying "The March 1951 attack on the US Information Centre was probably an attempt to portray the Iraqis as anti-American and to gain more support for the Zionist cause in the United States".

Moshe Gat asserts that Avnery wrote "without checking facts", Wolfsohn "distort(ed) the dates of the explosions", and that their works "served as the basis for the arguments of the Palestinian author Abbas Shiblak".

Yehuda Tajar, who spent ten years in Iraqi prison for his alleged involvement in the bombings, was interviewed in Arthur Neslen's 2006 book "Occupied Minds". According to Tajar, the widow of one of the Jewish activists implied he had organized attacks after his colleagues were arrested for the Masuda Shemtov synagogue bombing, to prove that those on trial were not the perpetrators.

In 2023 Avi Shlaim, an historian of Jewish-Iraqi background, concluded on the basis of an Iraqi police report and recollections of one of the original participants in the Iraqi Zionist underground confided to him in 2017, that Zionists had indeed been responsible for at least three of the five bombings.

=== Claims of no Israeli involvement ===
==== Jewish Telegraph Agency analysis ====
The Jewish Telegraph Agency notice from the time states that the bombers were charged with both the January 14, 1951 synagogue bombing and the 19th March grenade attack.

==== Moshe Gat's analysis ====
According to historian Moshe Gat, "not only did Israeli emissaries not place the bombs at the locations cited in the Iraqi statement, but also that there was in fact no need to take such drastic action in order to urge the Jews to leave Iraq for Israel".

- Gat relates to the alleged Israeli motivation to accelerate the Jewish registration to leave Iraq: "just over 105,000 Jews had registered by 8 March, of whom almost 40,000 had left the country. Some 15,000 more left illegally before and after the law was passed. Since the number of Jews living in Iraq before emigration began has been estimated at 125,000 this means that about 5,000 Jews were left, who had preferred to remain in Iraq. Why, then, would anyone in Israel have wanted to throw bombs? Whom would they have wanted to intimidate?"
- Gat wrote that frantic Jewish registration for denaturalisation and departure was driven by knowledge that the denaturalisation law was due to expire in March 1951. He also noted the influence of further pressures including the property-freezing law and continued anti-Jewish disturbances, which raised the fear of large-scale pogroms. According to Mendes, it was highly unlikely that the Israelis would have taken such measures to accelerate the Jewish evacuation given that they were already struggling to cope with the existing level of Jewish immigration.
- Gat also raised a number of questions about the trial and guilt of the alleged Jewish bomb throwers:
  - A nationalist Iraqi army officer known for his anti-Jewish views was originally arrested for the offenses, but never charged, after explosive devices similar to those used in the attack on the Jewish synagogue were found in his home.
  - The 1950–1951 bombings followed a long history of anti-Jewish incidents in Iraq (such as the Farhad) and the prosecution was not able to produce a single eyewitness.
  - Shalom Salah told the court that he had confessed after being severely tortured. There were no other evidence which directly related the accused to the bombing, but only circumstantial evidence concerning the discovery of explosive devices and weapons.
  - The 8 April 1950 bomb incident, in which 4 Jews were injured, was omitted from the charge sheet against the members of the underground, although it appeared in the government statement. The prosecutor "claimed that the perpetrators had planned to cause injury but not loss of life. The grenade, however, had claimed five lives at the synagogue (or four, according to the charges) and injured more than 20 people. This did not prevent the prosecutor, in his concluding address, from including this incident in the list of charges against the underground, although this contradicted the evidence of the two witnesses." Nevertheless, they were not accused for the synagogue bombing.

Gat suggests the perpetrators could have been members of the anti-Jewish Istiqlal Party. Yehuda Tajar, one of the alleged bombers, said the bombing were carried out by the Muslim Brotherhood.

According to Gat, "The British Foreign Office, which could hardly be suspected of pro-Zionist tendencies, never stated explicitly that it was the defendants who had thrown the bombs" and "US Embassy reports also cast considerable doubt as to whether the two men convicted were in fact guilty of throwing the bombs.".

==== Other claims of no Israeli involvement ====
Mordechai Ben Porat, founder and chair of the Babylonian Jewry Heritage Center, who was coordinating Jewish emigration at the time, was accused of orchestrating a bombing campaign to speed up the Jewish exodus from Iraq by Israeli journalist Baruch Nadel in 1977. Ben Porat sued the journalist for libel, ending in an out-of-court compromise, where Nadel retracted all the accusations against the Israeli emissaries, and apologized

In his 1996 book "To Baghdad and Back," Ben-Porat published the full report of a 1960 investigation committee appointed by David Ben-Gurion, which "did not find any factual proof that the bombs were hurled by any Jewish organization or individual" and was "convinced that no entity in Israel gave an order to perpetrate such acts of sabotage."

== Effects on Iraqi Jewish emigration ==
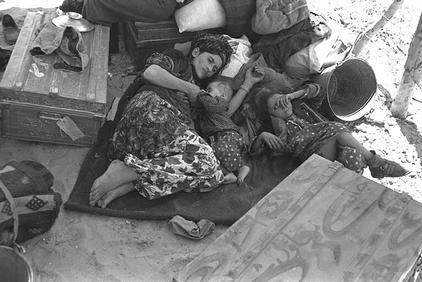
Displaced Iraqi Jews arrive in Israel, 1951

In March 1950 the government of Iraq passed the Denaturalisation Act that allowed Jews to emigrate if they renounced their Iraqi citizenship. Iraqi prime minister Tawfiq al-Suwaidi expected that 7,000–10,000 Jews out of the Iraqi Jewish population of 125,000 would leave. A few thousand Jews registered for the offer before the first bombing occurred. The first bombing occurred on the last day of Passover, 8 April 1950. Panic in the Jewish community ensued and many more Jews registered to leave Iraq. The law expired in March 1951 but was extended after the Iraqi government froze the assets of departing Jews, including those who had already left. Between the first and last bombing almost the entire Jewish community other than a few thousand had registered to leave the country. The emigration of Jews was also due to the deteriorating status of Jews in Iraq since the 1948 Arab-Israeli war as they were suspected of being disloyal to Iraq. They were treated with threats, suspicion and physical assaults and were portrayed by the media as a fifth column. By 1953, nearly all Jews had left the country. In his memoir of Jewish life in Baghdad, Sasson Somekh writes: "The pace of registration for the citizenship waiver was slow in the beginning, but it increased as tensions rose between Jews and their neighbors and after acts of terror were perpetrated against Jewish businesses and institutions – especially the Mas'uda Shem-Tov Synagogue...This was the place to which emigrating citizens were required to report with their luggage before leaving for Israel."

Historian Esther Meir-Glitzenstein disputed the claim that the bombings were the primary motive for the emigration of Iraqi Jews, noting that most accounts by these Jews did not mention the bombings as a cause for immigration.

== See also ==
- Farhud
- Shafiq Ades
- Lavon Affair
- Jewish exodus from Arab and Muslim countries
