= Edward M. Fram =

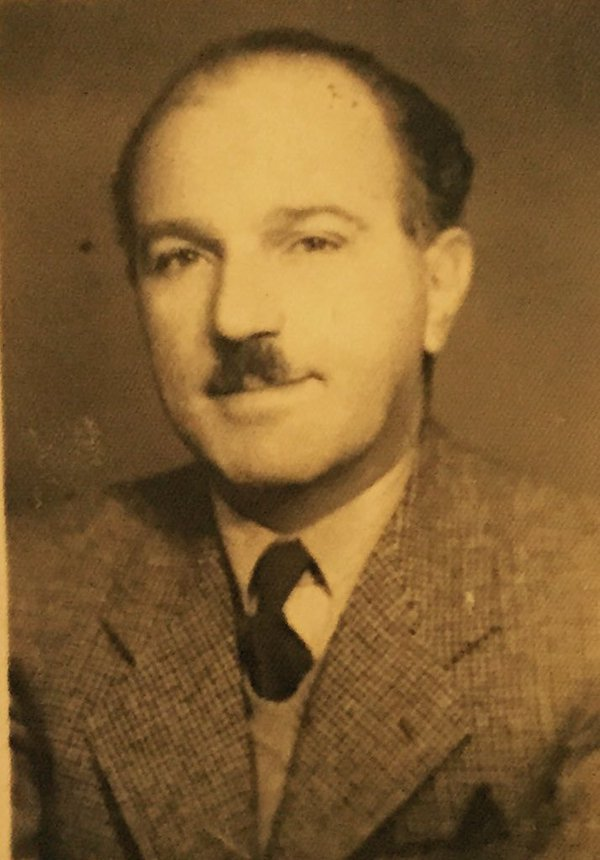
- Born: 1905
- Died: Unknown; Presumed Basra
- Occupation: Entrepreneur
- Known for: Philanthropy

Edward Manuel Fram (1905–1955) was an Iraqi entrepreneur and philanthropist.

== Early life ==
Edward Fram was born to a Jewish Iraqi mother, Sadie Chemtob. His father remains uncertain, but is likely to have been Ezekiel Ephraim [1870-1925] (also rendered Ephraim Yedidiah Ezekiel), originally from Kirkuk and known more widely as a Bombay merchant, from a distinguished Sephardic family. Edward’s sister, Bernadette, pre-deceased him at a young age. Edward had a painting commissioned to commemorate his sister and his first-born child was given ‘Bernadette’ as a middle name in her honour. Edward also had a large number of half-siblings from both his mother’s first marriage and Ezekiel’s two marriages (to Simah Bit Khatoon [? - 1906] and Lulu Mitana [1889-1922], respectively). One of his half-sisters was the one-time Congress Party agent Mozelle Ephraim Ezekiel Sofaer, recruited by Sarojini Naidu. Through Ezekiel Ephraim, Abraham David Sofaer is a half-first cousin, once removed.

== Business activities ==
=== Insurance ===
Living and working in Basra in what was then the Ottoman Empire, Edward Fram was a key figure in the country's modern insurance industry, as the owner of one of Iraq's first insurance agencies operating under the Insurance Companies Act No. 74 (1 April 1936). This was the first Iraqi law passed to specifically regulate the industry. Prior to this, only 3 insurance companies were known to be operating in Iraq, under the Ottoman Commercial Law of 9 August 1904, one of which was the General Accident Fire and Life Assurance Corporation (now Aviva Insurance Ltd.) from 1928. By the time of the nationalisation of the industry in 1964, there were still just 15 branches and agencies of regional (Arab) and foreign insurance companies across Iraq, including Egypt's Al-Chark Insurance Company. Al-Chark (part of Misr Insurance since 2007) was the first to set up an agency in Transjordan towards the end of the 1940s and was one of the first in Iraq, where Edward Fram acted as their agent from as early as 1936. Fram also represented France's oldest insurer L’Union de Paris (later UAP, now part of AXA) and other insurance companies, along with Shafiq Ades, Andrew Weir, 1st Baron Inverforth and other notable businessmen.

Agents and representatives of L'Union de Paris, Baghdad Branch. Edward Fram (top right), Clement Shammas (top left). In 1966, Shammas was appointed by Iraq’s then Prime Minister Abdul Rahman al-Bazzaz as the head of the Iraqi Insurance Organisation (abolished in 1988). Taken by A.Abbosh & Co., photographer who held the Royal Warrant to H.M. the King of Iraq; date unknown.

=== Bonds and securities ===
Fram was one of the first and main players in Basra's nascent bonds and securities markets from the mid-1930s. His name is the only one listed in the Basra bonds section within Iraq's sole pre-Baathist business directory, published by the Interior Ministry in 1936.

=== Other ===
Fram was a major goods importer, exporter, makers' representative and also acted as the exclusive agent in Iraq for Selfridges, amongst other western companies.

Letter from Mülhens GmbH & Co. naming Edward M. Fram's company as the sole distributor of all 4711 products in Iraq, March 1954. Source: The Foundation of Rhine-Westphalia Economy Archive of Cologne (RWWA).

During the Second World War, he provided housing for British troops as part of the development of Basra as a "large-scale base" and traded scrap metal left by the British military after the war, as did other well-known merchants such as Naji Al-Khedhairi. Fram also ran the Basra office of Iraq Tours, the country's first travel agency, which had Iraqi Prime Minister Tawfiq al-Suwaydi as chairman, and which played a key role in Operation Ezra and Nehemiah alongside Near East Air Transport and the Israeli national airline El Al.

== Death ==
Edward Fram died in mysterious circumstances aged 50 purportedly in a car accident, a short distance from his hometown of Basra, on his return from a visit to the Hanna-Sheikh family's Abu Al-Khaseeb retreat. A member of the Al-Sa'adoon family with whom he was travelling also died in the crash, along with the chauffeur.

However, recent research undertaken by his grandson has cast doubt on this narrative of events as the immediate family were not asked to identify his body, the remains of which apparently required dental records for verification. According to his eldest child’s account (only 18 at the time), Edward Fram’s office was quickly cleared of all documents shortly after he was last known to be alive in the Spring of 1955. His place of burial is unknown and there are references to him (albeit under the thinly disguised alias, Edward Em. Ephram) in Middle East Business directories as recently as 1963.

== Family and legacy ==
Edward Fram was survived by seven children (five daughters, two sons) and his wife, Salima (1920–1961). His youngest daughter, Thelma Edward Marougy (née Fram), is a fluid specialist at Eaton Corporation. Edward Fram is the grandfather of American technology executive and namesake, Edward Y Abbo, formerly Senior Vice President at Oracle Corporation and currently President and Chief Technical Officer at C3 IoT, a data analytics company founded in 2009 by Tom Siebel. He is also the grandfather of Michael Y Abbo, an emergency physician and assistant clinical professor at the University of California San Francisco, Ayad Sarraf, former manager of Fulham Deaf FC and now club secretary, Sally Fram, PhD - a British cancer expert and regulatory affairs executive at AstraZeneca and singer-songwriter, Ed Fram. Edward Fram is the great-grandfather of Rafi Allos, an intellectual property specialist and partner at Allen & Overy.
