= Insurance in Iraq =

Insurance in Iraq refers to the insurance industry in Iraq and charts its history from the Babylonians of Mesopotamia through to the present day, by highlighting key events (such as the signing of treaties and laws), people and companies that influenced its formation and current shape.

== History ==
=== Ancient times ===
Mechanisms for dealing with risk in Iraq can be traced to the ancient Babylonians and the Code of Hammurabi. This established a system of bottomry (whereby the ship master would take a loan and then use the ship itself as collateral against it) and is seen as an early form of merchant and marine insurance dating back to around 1772 BCE.

=== Insurance under Ottoman laws ===
Two pieces of legislation are noteworthy during this period, firstly the Ottoman Commercial Law (9 August 1904), followed by the supplementary Ottoman Insurance Companies Act (1905). Despite these, there is no evidence to suggest commercial, institutional insurance activity was known in Iraq until at least after the Anglo-Iraqi Treaty of October 1922. Indeed, by 1928 only 3 insurance companies were known to be operating in Iraq, under the Ottoman laws, one of which was the General Accident Fire and Life Assurance Corporation (now Aviva Insurance Ltd.).

=== Foreign agencies and the birth of modern insurance in Iraq (1936-1964) ===
The Insurance Companies Act was brought into effect on 1 April 1936. It was the first Iraqi law passed to specifically regulate the industry. Egypt's Al-Chark Insurance Company (part of Misr Insurance since 2007) was the first to set up an agency in Transjordan towards the end of the 1940s and was one of the first in Iraq under the 1936 law, where Edward Fram acted as their first representative. Other insurance pioneers at this time included Shafiq Ades and Andrew Weir, 1st Baron Inverforth

=== Nationalisation of the industry (1964) ===
In 1960, the introduction of the Insurance Firms and Agents Law No. 49 replaced the aforementioned law of 1936. By the time of the nationalisation of the industry in 1964, there were still just 15 branches and agencies of regional (Arab) and foreign insurance companies across Iraq. These included the following:

- l Ittihad Al Watani (L’ Union Nationale), General Insurance Co for the Near East, S.A.L.
- 2 Compagnie Libanaise d’Assurance
- 3 Al-Chark Insurance Company
- 4 Misr Insurance Company
- 5 Arabia Insurance Company
- 6 Royal Insurance Company
- 7 Atlas Insurance Company
- 8 London Provincial Marine & General Insurance Company
- 9 Sun Insurance Office
- 10 Guardian Assurance Company
- 11 Société l'Union des Assurances de Paris
- 12 Provincial Assurance
- 13 American Life Insurance Company
- 14 New India Insurance Company
- 15 National Insurance Company of New Zealand

In 1966, two years after the nationalisation was completed, Clement Shammas was appointed by Iraq's then Prime Minister Abdul Rahman al-Bazzaz as the head of the newly formed Iraqi Insurance Organisation (abolished in 1988). Under the Baath Party in 1997, Law No. 49 (1960) was itself repealed handing the Iraqi Ministry of Finance the authority to oversee all insurance and reinsurance activities in Iraq. At this time, private insurance companies were also allowed to form and the first such company, Dar Al-Salam Insurance Co, was established in 2000

== Present day market ==
=== Post-Baathist insurance (2003 - present) ===
The current legislation is the Insurance Business Regulation Law (2005) drafted under the guidance of USAID/BearingPoint Inc. It is difficult to get an accurate estimate of the size of the current industry in Iraq, but using gross written premiums as a guide, the 2013 figure was in the region of $300–480million (with $240–400 million from state-owned companies and $60–80 million from privately owned ones).
