= Iraqi diaspora in West Asia =

The Iraqi diaspora in West Asia is mostly located in Syria, Jordan, Iran and Lebanon, in addition to the well established numbers in the Persian Gulf states and Israel. As a result of the Iraq War, the Iraqi refugee crisis is the largest in West Asia in 60 years, since 1948 when the State of Israel was established.

Most of the recent Iraqi immigrants fleeing to Iran and Lebanon are believed to be Shia. Religion often determines which countries the Iraqi people will apply asylum for, decades ago most of the Iraqi Jews fled to Israel through Operation Ezra and Nehemiah. Almost all of Iraq's Christians are now in Lebanon and in the Christian towns of Syria, such as Jaramanah, where migration has doubled with 100,000 Iraqi refugees present.

Iraqis living in the Persian Gulf states face hardship because of the political conflicts between certain governments, especially in Kuwait due to the Gulf War. There has been hostility towards the Iraqi people living in Arabia and are often subjected to living in inhumane conditions. The academics and younger generation of Iraq, seek refuge in the United Arab Emirates for better career opportunities.

== Present-day Iraqi diaspora communities in West Asia ==
=== Armenia ===
Sources claim 460 Iraqi refugees are living in Armenia.

=== Jordan ===
Jordan had taken in roughly 750,000 Iraqi refugees since the war began by December 2006. Jordan had been criticized by human rights organizations for not classifying the newcomers by the title "refugee" and instead labeled them "visitors," disinclining the Jordanian government from extending to the Iraqis the same benefits enjoyed by 1.5 million Palestinian refugees residing in Jordan.

Jordanians expressed resentment to the newcomers, built up since the influx of refugees during and following the Persian Gulf War in 1990-1991. Then, affluent Iraqis arrived and invested in the Jordanian economy, sending prices soaring too high for many working class or lower class Jordanians. Following the 2003 war and subsequent reconstruction, the arrival of mostly poor Iraqis compounded problems, increasing demand and applying more pressure on the Jordanian economy.

The government had also been accused of cracking down on Shiite activities in the country while allowing Sunni Iraqis to carry on their lives without harassment from the government. The authorities denied any discrimination, claiming it treated any illicit activity by Sunnis or Shiites from Iraq equally.

=== Kuwait ===
The current Iraqi population in Kuwait is difficult to determine, as there are no official figures, but estimates range from 10,000 to 13,000. According to the UNHCR, only 427 Iraqis have been registered as asylum seekers and 18 Iraqis have been recognized as refugees in Kuwait.

Due to poor Iraqi-Kuwaiti relations, Kuwait had previously announced that it will not provide shelter for any Iraqi refugees and will prevent them from entering the country by guarding the border with Saudi Arabian troops. However, Kuwait did announce that they will hold any refugees in a 15 kilometer-wide demilitarized strip on the Iraqi side of the border, where it would provide humanitarian assistance.

Kuwait has maintained strict regulations when considering refugees; however, the country hosted 15,000 Iraqis throughout the 1990s, most of which have resided in Kuwait. Currently, the country shelters some 13,000 Iraqis according to the UNHCR.

=== United Arab Emirates ===
The current population of Iraqis in the United Arab Emirates is estimated to be around 100,000.

=== Yemen ===
Since the war in 2003, despite not sharing a border with Iraq, Yemen has become a host country for many Iraqi refugees. However, in 2004, the Yemeni government has changed its policy and currently requires Iraqi nationals to hold visas before letting them into Yemen; this has restricted their entry into the country. It is difficult to estimate how many Iraqis are in Yemen, as the numbers vary frequently, with many arriving and leaving quickly. In 2004, the UNHCR estimated that 100,000 Iraqis were living in Yemen.
