= Farhud =

1941 anti-Jewish massacre in Baghdad, Iraq

- Part of Anglo–Iraqi War
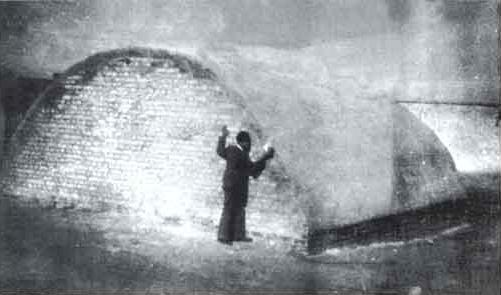
- Mass grave for the victims, 1946
- Location: Baghdad, Iraq
- Date: 1–2 June 1941
- Target: Iraqi Jews
- Attack type: Pogrom, genocidal massacre, ethnic cleansing, gang rape, and mutilation
- Deaths: 500+ Jews killed
- Injuries: 1,000
- Perpetrators: Rashid Ali, Yunis al-Sabawi, al-Futuwa youths, and Iraqi mobs
- Motive: Antisemitism, Iraqi nationalism

The Farhud (Arabic: الفرهود, romanized: al-Farhūd) was a pogrom carried out against the Jewish population of Baghdad, Iraq, on 1–2 June 1941 (coinciding with the Jewish holiday of Shavuot), immediately following the British victory in the Anglo-Iraqi War. The riots occurred in a power vacuum that followed the collapse of the pro-Fascist and pro-Nazi government of Rashid Ali al-Gaylani while the city was in a state of instability. The violence came immediately after the rapid defeat of Rashid Ali by British forces, whose earlier coup had generated a short period of national euphoria, and was fueled by allegations that Iraqi Jews had aided the British. More than 180 Jews were killed, with some reports that as many as 600 Jewish victims were buried in a mass grave. A thousand Jews were injured, Jewish property was looted and 900 Jewish homes were destroyed. Some non-Jewish rioters were killed in the attempt to quell the violence.

On account of the role of Axis and pro-Axis elements in inciting and eventually carrying out the pogrom, it is often argued to have constituted the extension of the Shoah in Iraq, though this classification, and even its inclusion as part of the wider Holocaust, have been disputed. In any case, as with other persecutions of Jews outside of Europe, it is often overlooked when compared to the Holocaust in Europe, especially outside of Israel (where the vast majority of Iraqi Jews, as well as their descendants, currently live).

The event spurred a migration of Iraqi Jews out of the country, although a direct connection to the 1951–1952 Jewish exodus from Iraq is also disputed, (Note: Historian Moshe Gat writes, "On his first visit to Baghdad, Enzo Sereni noted that '[...] The Jews have adapted to the new situation with the British occupation, which has again given them the possibility of free movement after months of detention and fear.' It is not surprising, in light of the economic boom and the security granted by the government, that Jews who left Iraq immediately after the riots, later returned [...] Their dream of integration into Iraqi society had been dealt a severe blow by the farhud but as the years passed self-confidence was restored, since the state continued to protect the Jewish community and they continued to prosper.") as many Jews who left Iraq immediately following the Farhud later returned to the country, and permanent Jewish emigration out of Iraq did not accelerate significantly until 1950–1951.

== Background ==
=== Jews in Baghdad ===
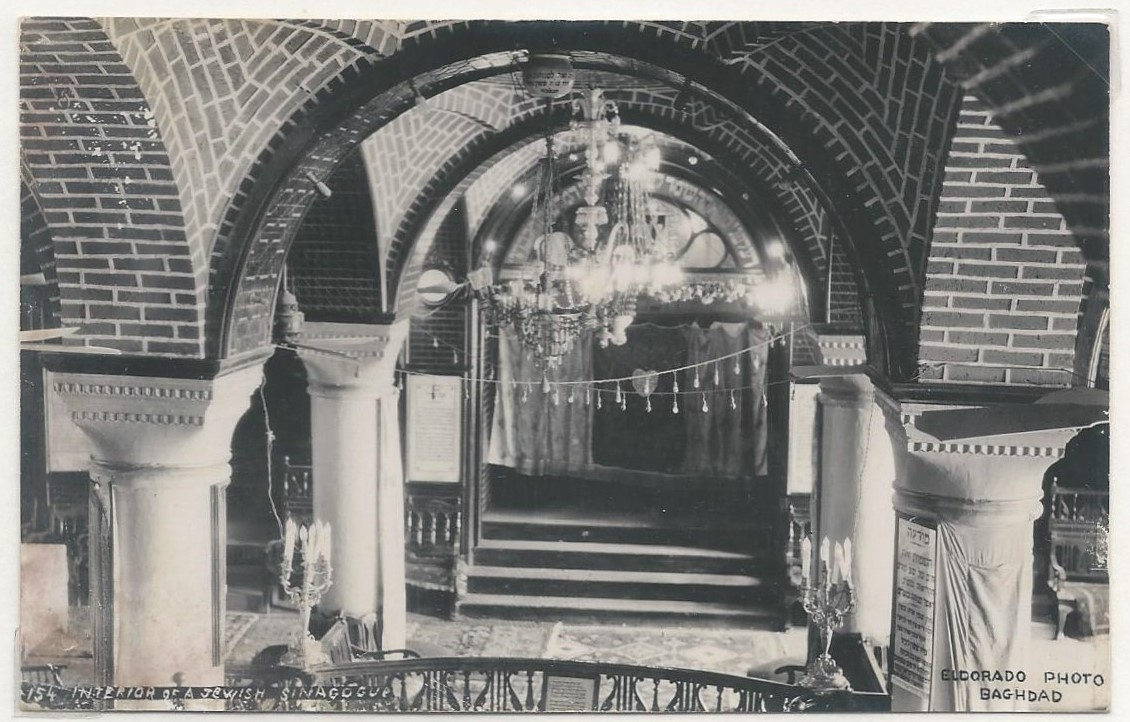
The Great Synagogue of Baghdad in the early 20th century.

In the 1930s, the situation of the Jews in Iraq deteriorated. Previously, the growing Iraqi Arab nationalist sentiment included Iraqi Jews as fellow Arabs, but these views changed with the ongoing conflict in Mandatory Palestine and the introduction of Nazi propaganda directed at the Arab world. Despite protestations of their loyalty to Iraq, Iraqi Jews were increasingly subject to discrimination and anti-Jewish actions. In September 1934, following the appointment of Arshad al-Umari as the new minister of economics and communications, tens of Jews were dismissed from their posts in that ministry; and, subsequently, there were unofficial quotas of Jews that could be appointed in the civil service or admitted to secondary schools and colleges. Zionist activity in Iraq had continued covertly even after 1929, but in 1935 the last two Palestinian Jewish teachers were deported, and the president of the Zionist organization was put on trial and ultimately required to leave the country.

=== Independence of Iraq ===
After the Ottoman Empire's defeat in World War I and subsequent dissolution, the League of Nations granted the mandate of Iraq to Britain. After King Ghazi who inherited the throne of Faisal I, died in a 1939 car accident, Britain installed 'Abd al-Ilah as Iraq's governing regent.

By 1941 the approximately 150,000 Iraqi Jews played active roles in many aspects of Iraqi life, including farming, banking, commerce and the government bureaucracy.

=== Iraq in World War II ===
Iraqi nationalist Rashid Ali al-Gaylani was appointed prime minister again in 1940, and attempted to ally with the Axis powers in order to remove the remaining British influence in the country.

Much of the population had retained significant anti-British sentiments since the 1920 Iraqi revolt, although the Jewish population was viewed as pro-British during World War II, contributing to the separation of the Muslim and Jewish communities.

In addition, between 1932 and 1941, the German embassy in Iraq, headed by Dr. Fritz Grobba, significantly supported antisemitic and fascist movements. Intellectuals and army officers were invited to Germany as guests of the Nazi party, and antisemitic material was published in the newspapers. The German embassy purchased the newspaper Al-alam Al-arabi ("The Arab world") which published, in addition to antisemitic propaganda, a translation of Mein Kampf in Arabic. Adolf Hitler's speeches were translated and distributed in Arabic. The German embassy also supported the establishment of Al-Fatwa, a youth organization based upon the model of the Hitler Youth. Amin al-Husseini, the Grand Mufti of Jerusalem, came to Baghdad in 1939, where he was active in spreading antisemitic and pro-German propaganda.

== Events preceding the Farhud ==
=== The Golden Square coup ===
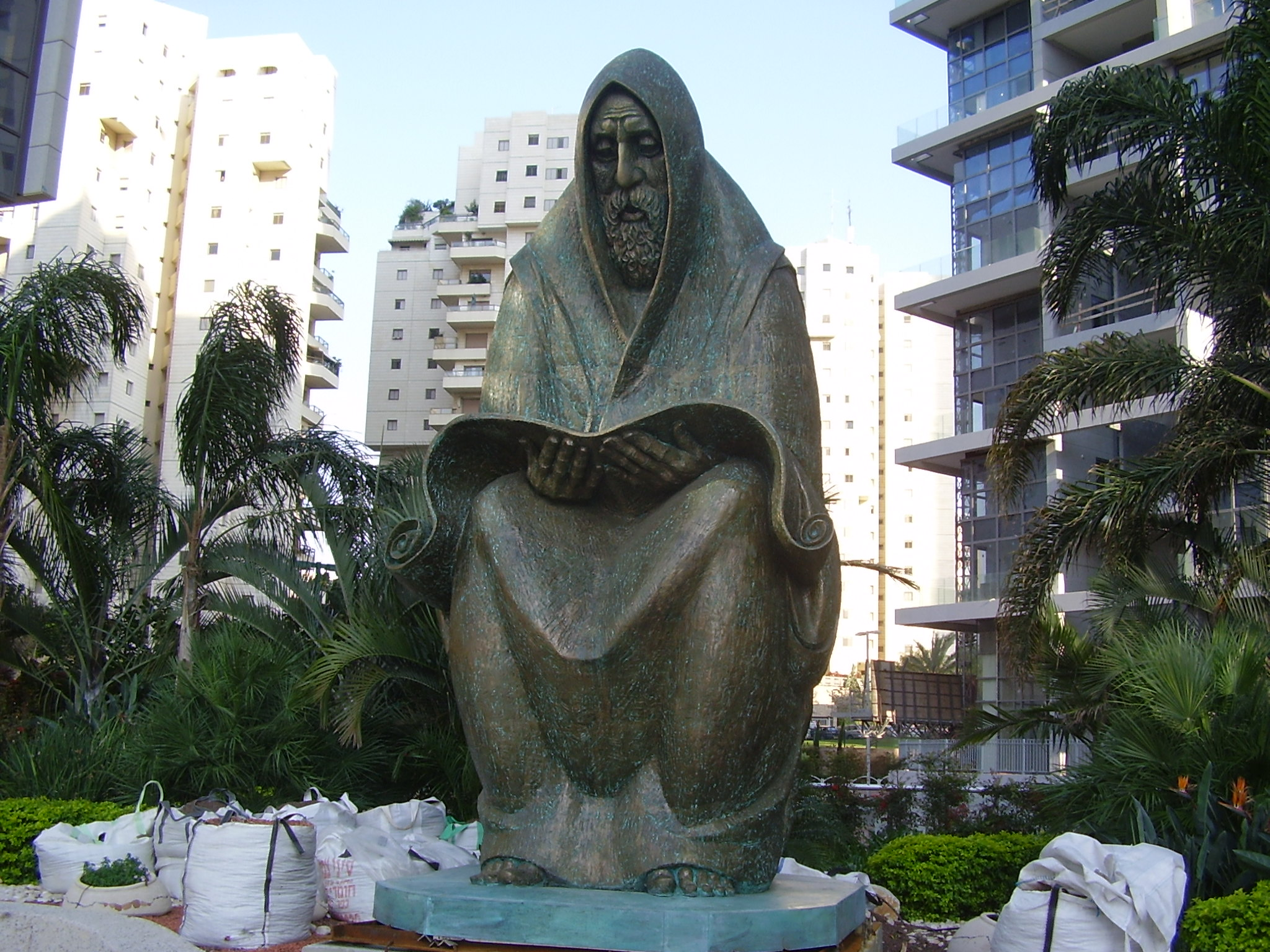
Monument "Prayer" in Ramat Gan in memory of the Jews who were killed in Iraq in the Pogrom "Farhud" (1941) and in the 1960s

In 1941 a group of pro-Fascist and pro-Nazi Iraqi officers, known as the "Golden Square" and led by General Rashid Ali, overthrew Regent Abdul Ilah on April 1 after staging a successful coup. The coup had significant popular support, particularly in Baghdad. Historian Orit Bashkin writes that "All, apparently, yearned for the departure of the British after two long decades of interference in Iraqi affairs".

Iraq's new government then was quickly involved in confrontation with the British over the terms of the Anglo-Iraqi Treaty signed in 1930. The treaty gave the British unlimited rights to base and transit forces through Iraq. In response to the coup, the British landed the 10th Indian Infantry Brigade at Basra. Officials of the new regime refused to let them land and confrontations afterward occurred both near Basra in the south and to the west of Baghdad near the British base complex and airfield. The Germans dispatched a group of 26 heavy fighters to aid in a futile air attack on RAF Habbaniya which was defeated.

Winston Churchill sent a telegram to US President Franklin D. Roosevelt, warning him that if the Middle East fell to Germany, victory against the Nazis would be a "hard, long and bleak proposition" given that Hitler would have access to the oil reserves there. The telegram dealt with the larger issues of war in the Middle East rather than Iraq exclusively.

On 25 May Hitler issued his Order 30, stepping up German offensive operations: "The Arab Freedom Movement in the Middle East is our natural ally against England. In this connection special importance is attached to the liberation of Iraq ... I have therefore decided to move forward in the Middle East by supporting Iraq."

On 30 May the British-organized force called Kingcol led by Brigadier J.J. Kingstone reached Baghdad, causing the "Golden Square" and their supporters to escape via Iran to Germany. Kingcol included some elements of the Arab Legion led by Major John Bagot Glubb known as Glubb Pasha.

On 31 May Regent Abdul Illah prepared to fly back into Baghdad to reclaim his leadership. To avoid the impression of a British-organized countercoup, the regent entered Baghdad without a British escort.

Michael Eppel, in his book "The Palestinian Conflict in Modern Iraq", blames the Farhud on the influence of German ideology on the Iraqi people, as well as extreme nationalism, both of which were heightened by the Golden Square coup.

=== Antisemitic actions preceding the Farhud ===
Sami Michael, a witness to the Farhud, testified: "Antisemite propaganda was broadcast routinely by the local radio and Radio Berlin in Arabic. Various anti-Jewish slogans were written on walls on the way to school, such as "Hitler was killing the Jewish germs". Shops owned by Muslims had 'Muslim' written on them, so they would not be damaged in the case of anti-Jewish riots."

Shalom Darwish, the secretary of the Jewish community in Baghdad, testified that several days before the Farhud, the homes of Jews were marked with a red palm print ("Hamsa"), by al-Futuwa youth. Al-Sabawi also instructed Jews in Baghdad to pack suitcases and to wait to be taken to "detention camps" "for their own safety".

Two days before the Farhud, Yunis al-Sabawi, a government minister who proclaimed himself the governor of Baghdad, summoned Rabbi Sasson Khaduri, the community leader, and recommended to him that Jews stay in their homes for the next three days as a protective measure. He had planned for a larger massacre, preparing to broadcast a call for the Baghdad public to massacre Jews. However, the broadcast was never made since al-Sabawi was forced to flee the country.

During the fall of the Rashid Ali government, false rumors were circulated that Jews used radios to signal the Royal Air Force and distributed British propaganda.

According to Hayyim Cohen, the Farhud "was the only such instance of Jewish shops and synagogues destroyed, Jewish girls being gang raped, and mob violence known to the Jews of Iraq, at least during their last hundred years of life there". Historian Edy Cohen writes that up until the Farhud, Jews had enjoyed relatively favorable conditions and coexistence with Muslims in Iraq.

== Farhud (1–2 June 1941) ==
According to Iraqi government and British historical sources violence started when a delegation of Jewish Iraqis arrived at the Palace of Flowers (Qasr al Zuhur) to meet with the Regent Abdullah, and were attacked en route by an Iraqi Arab mob as they crossed Al Khurr Bridge. Iraqi Arab civil disorder and violence then swiftly spread to the Al Rusafa and Abu Sifyan districts, and got worse the next day when elements of the Iraqi police began joining in with the attacks upon the Jewish population, involving shops belonging to it being set on fire and a synagogue being destroyed. Many Jewish girls were gang-raped and children maimed and killed in front of their families.

However, Zvi Yehuda, a professor of Jewish Studies, has suggested that the event that set off the rioting was anti-Jewish preaching in the Jami-Al-Gaylani mosque, and that the violence was premeditated rather than a spontaneous outburst. Mordechai Ben-Porat, who later became the leader of the Iraqi Zionists, described his experience as follows:

We were mostly cut off from the center of the Jewish community and our Muslim neighbors became our friends. It was because of one Muslim neighbor, in fact, that we survived the Farhoud. We had no weapons to defend ourselves and were utterly helpless. We put furniture up against the doors and windows to prevent the rioters from breaking in. Then, Colonel Arif's wife came rushing out of her house with a grenade and a pistol and shouted at the rioters, 'If you don’t leave, I will explode this grenade right here!' Her husband was apparently not home and she had either been instructed by him to defend us or decided on her own to help. They dispersed, and that was that – she saved our lives.

In some instances, common criminals came to the help of the Jews. In one case, a young Muslim woman, who, ironically, had been looting with her sister, saw a pogromist attacking a young Jewish man. The attacker responded by stabbing her to death. He was later convicted of murder and hanged. A man known to be a thief protected roughly 100 Jews in his neighborhood, forcing the local baker and grocery store owner to give them food. Jews themselves also fought back, using knives, rocks, pistols, and clubs.

The dean of Midrash Bet Zilkha, Yaakov Mutzafi, raced to open up the gates of the yeshiva to shelter the victims of the Farhud who were displaced from their homes, and secured money for their upkeep from philanthropists in the community.

Civil order was restored after two days of violence in the afternoon of 2 June, when Prime Minister Jamil Al Midfai imposed a curfew and shot violators on sight. An investigation conducted by British journalist Tony Rocca of the Sunday Times attributed the delay to a personal decision by Kinahan Cornwallis, the British Ambassador to Iraq, who failed to immediately carry out orders he received from the Foreign Office in the matter, and initially denied requests from British Imperial military and civil officers on the scene for permission to act against the attacking Arab mobs. The British also delayed their entry into Baghdad for 48 hours, which some testimonies suggest was due to having ulterior motives in allowing a clash to happen between Muslims and Jews in the city.

=== Casualties ===
The exact number of victims is uncertain. With respect to Jewish victims, some sources say that about 180 Jewish Iraqis were killed and about 240 were wounded, 586 Jewish-owned businesses were looted and 99 Jewish houses were destroyed. Other accounts state that nearly 200 were killed and more than 2,000 injured, while 900 Jewish homes and hundreds of Jewish-owned shops destroyed and looted. The Israeli-based Babylonian Jewry Heritage Center maintains that in addition to 180 identified victims, around another 600 unidentified ones were buried in a mass grave. Zvi Zameret of Israel's Education Ministry says 180 were killed and 700 wounded. Bashkin writes that "a constant element that appears in most accounts of the Farhud is a narrative relating to a good neighbor [...] Judging by the lists of the Jewish dead, it seems that Jews in mixed neighborhoods stood a better chance of surviving the riots than those in uniformly Jewish areas." A document discovered from the Iraqi Jewish Archive estimated that more than a thousand Jews were murdered or disappeared.

When the forces loyal to the regent entered to restore order, many rioters were killed. The Iraqi Commission Report noted that: "After some delay the Regent ... arranged for the dispatch of troops to take control ... There was no more aimless firing into the air; their machine guns swept the streets clear of people and quickly put a stop to looting and rioting." The British Ambassador noted that the second day was more violent than the first, and that "Iraqi troops killed as many rioters as the rioters killed Jews." The Iraqi Commission Report estimated the total number of Jews and Muslims killed at 130. Eliahu Eilat, a Jewish Agency agent estimated 1,000 as the total number of Jews and Muslims who died, with other similar accounts estimating 300–400 pogromists killed by the Regent's army.

== Aftermath ==
=== Iraqi monarchist response ===
Within a week of the riots, on 7 June, the reinstated monarchist Iraqi government set up a committee of inquiry to investigate the events. According to Peter Wien, the regime "made every effort to present the followers of the Rashid 'Ali movement as proxies of Nazism".

The monarchist government acted quickly to suppress supporters of Rashid Ali. Many Iraqis were exiled as a result, and hundreds were jailed. Military courts were convened to try the rioters and those responsible for the coup. A number of men, including Yunis al-Sabawi and multiple Iraqi Army officers and policemen, were legally sentenced to death in consequence of the violence by the newly established pro-British Iraqi government. (Note: According to Gat, "The government – particularly after Nuri as-Said came to power in October 1941 – took swift action to suppress pro-Nazi elements and other supporters of Rashid Ali. They were placed on trial, many of them were exiled, hundreds were incarcerated in concentration camps and a very small minority were even executed. In parallel, the government acted swiftly to defend Jewish quarters and was resolved to prevent any similar events from occurring in the future. On the decision of the Iraqi government, a committee of enquiry was set up on 7 June a few days after the pogrom, to examine the facts and find who was culpable.")

=== Long-term impact ===
In some accounts the Farhud marked the turning point for Iraq's Jews. Other historians, however, see the pivotal moment for the Iraqi Jewish community much later, between 1948 and 1951, since Jewish communities prospered along with the rest of the country throughout most of the 1940s, and many Jews who left Iraq following the Farhud returned to the country shortly thereafter and permanent emigration did not accelerate significantly until 1950–1951. Bashkin writes that "In the context of Jewish-Iraqi history, moreover, a distinction should be made between an analysis of the Farhud and the Farhudization of Jewish Iraqi history – viewing the Farhud as typifying the history of the relationship between Jews and greater Iraqi society. The Jewish community strived for integration in Iraq before and after the Farhud. In fact, the attachment of the community to Iraq was so tenacious that even after such a horrible event, most Jews continued to believe that Iraq was their homeland."

Either way, the Farhud is broadly understood to mark the start of a process of politicization of the Iraqi Jews in the 1940s, primarily amongst the younger population, especially as a result of the impact it had on hopes of long term integration into Iraqi society. In the direct aftermath of the Farhud, many joined the Iraqi Communist Party in order to protect the Jews of Baghdad, yet they did not want to leave the country and rather sought to fight for better conditions in Iraq itself. At the same time the Iraqi government which had taken over after the Farhud reassured the Iraqi Jewish community, and normal life soon returned to Baghdad, which saw a marked betterment of its economic situation during World War II.

It was only after the Iraqi government initiated a policy shift towards the Iraqi Jews in 1948, curtailing their civil rights and firing many Jewish state employees, that the Farhud began to be regarded as more than just an outburst of violence instigated by foreign influences, namely Nazi propaganda.

On 23 October 1948, Shafiq Ades, a respected Jewish businessman, was publicly hanged in Basra on charges of selling weapons to Israel and the Iraqi Communist Party, despite the fact he was an outspoken anti-Zionist. The event increased the sense of insecurity among Jews. The Jewish community general sentiment was that if a man as well connected and powerful as Ades could be eliminated by the state, other Jews would not be protected any longer, and the Farhud was no longer seen as an isolated incident. During this period, the Iraqi Jewish community became increasingly fearful.

=== Remembrances ===
A monument, called Prayer, located in Ramat Gan, is in memory of the Jews who were killed in Iraq during the Farhud and in the 1960s.

1 June 2015 was the first International Farhud Day at the United Nations.

== See also ==
- 1945 Anti-Jewish riots in Tripolitania
- 1947 Aden riots
- Al-Muthanna Club
- 1950–1951 Baghdad bombings
- Antisemitism in the Arab world
- Islam and antisemitism
- List of massacres in Iraq
- Shafiq Ades
- The Legacy of Islamic Antisemitism
- 1969 Baghdad hangings
