= Avi Shlaim =

Israeli-British historian (born 1945)

Avi Shlaim FBA
- אבי שליים أفي شلايم
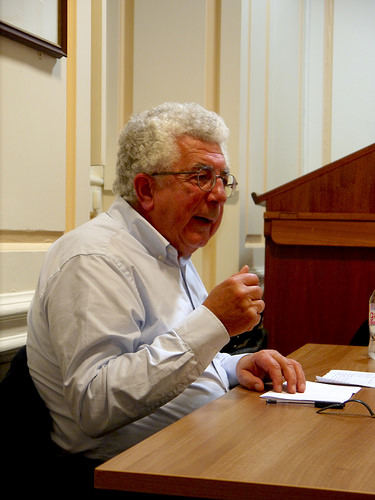
- Shlaim in 2015
- Born: 31 October 1945 (age 81); Baghdad, Kingdom of Iraq
- Citizenship: Israel; United Kingdom
- Spouse: Gwyneth Daniel (m. 1973)
- Children: 1
- Awards: British Academy Medal (2017)

Academic background
- Education: Jesus College, Cambridge (BA); London School of Economics (MSc); University of Reading (PhD)
- Thesis: The United States and the Berlin Blockade, 1948–1949: A Study in Crisis Decision Making (1980)

Academic work
- Discipline: Historian
- School or tradition: New Historians
- Institutions: University of Reading; St Antony's College, Oxford

Avi Shlaim FBA (Hebrew: אבי שליים; Arabic: أفي شلايم; born 31 October 1945) is an Israeli and British historian of Iraqi Jewish descent. He is one of Israel's "New Historians", a group of Israeli scholars who put forward critical interpretations of the history of Zionism and Israel.

Born in 1945, his family emigrated to Israel in 1951 during Operation Ezra and Nehemiah. He later moved to England in 1966 and studied and taught international relations at the University of Reading. He began studying the Israeli–Palestinian conflict in 1982, when 1948 Arab–Israeli War archives were unclassified by the Israeli government. Shlaim has an extensive bibliography and has contributed to various newspapers and publishers.

Shlaim's scholarship has been praised by historians and commentators, including Norman Finkelstein, Benny Morris and Anne Irfan, especially for his use of newly available sources and reinterpretation of Israeli history, Zionism and Palestine. Others like Yoav Gelber, Joseph Heller and Efraim Karsh say his conclusions reflect political bias that leads to flaws in his methodology and interpretation.

== Biography ==
Shlaim was born in 1945 in Baghdad, Kingdom of Iraq, into a wealthy non-Zionist Jewish family that considered itself part of the Arab world, speaking only Arabic at home. They considered themselves Iraqi first, then Jews.

In the 1930s, the situation of the Jews in Iraq deteriorated, with the rise of nationalisms in Arab countries and concomitant growth of Jewish nationalism in the form of Zionism. Persecution of Jews was exacerbated after the defeat of the Arab armies in 1948 and Israel's independence. In 1951, during Operation Ezra and Nehemiah, Shlaim's family, along with most of Iraq's Jews, registered to emigrate to Israel and forfeit their Iraqi citizenship. The family lost all their property and emigrated to Israel.

Shlaim grew up in Ramat Gan. He left Israel for England at age 16 to study at a Jewish school. He returned to Israel in 1964 to serve in the Israel Defense Forces, serving for two years as a communications instructor, then moved back to England in 1966 to study history at Jesus College, Cambridge. He obtained his BA degree in 1969. He obtained an MSc (Econ.) in International Relations in 1970 from the London School of Economics and a PhD from the University of Reading. He was a lecturer and reader in politics in the University of Reading from 1970 to 1987.

He married the great-granddaughter of David Lloyd George, who was the British prime minister at the time of the Balfour Declaration. He has lived in the United Kingdom since 1966, and holds dual British and Israeli nationality.

== Academic career ==
Shlaim taught international relations at Reading University, specialising in European issues. His academic interest in the history of Israel began in 1982, when Israeli government archives about the 1948 Arab–Israeli War were opened, an interest that deepened when he became a fellow of St Antony's College, Oxford, in 1987. He was Alastair Buchan Reader in international relations at Oxford from 1987 to 1996 and director of graduate studies in that subject in 1993–1995 and 1998–2001. He held a British Academy research readership in 1995–97 and a research professorship in 2003–2006.

Shlaim served as an outside examiner on the doctoral thesis of Ilan Pappé. Shlaim's approach to the study of history is informed by his belief that "the historian's most fundamental task is not to chronicle but to evaluate... to subject the claims of all the protagonists to rigorous scrutiny and reject all those claims, however deeply cherished, that do not stand up."

== Views and opinions ==
After the Six-Day War, Shlaim started to become disillusioned with Zionism. He described his views as initially between those of Benny Morris and Ilan Pappé of the New Historians, but said that he has since moved closer to Pappé, or what he called "to a radical stance".

Shlaim is a regular contributor to The Guardian, and in 2009 signed an open letter condemning Israel's role in the 2008–09 Gaza War that was published in the paper.

Writing in The Spectator, Shlaim called Prime Minister Benjamin Netanyahu a "proponent of the doctrine of permanent conflict", describing his policies as an attempt to preclude a peaceful resolution to the conflict with Palestinians. Furthermore, he described Israeli foreign policy as one that supported stability of Arab regimes over nascent democratic movements during the Arab Spring.

Shlaim is a member of the British Labour Party. In 2015, he was a signatory to a letter criticising The Jewish Chronicle's reporting of Jeremy Corbyn's association with alleged antisemites.

In Three Worlds: Memoirs of an Arab-Jew, Shlaim unveils "undeniable proof of Zionist involvement in the terrorist attacks" that prompted a mass exodus of Jews from Iraq between 1950 and 1951. Shlaim writes that most of the bombings against Jews in Iraq were the work of Mossad. He believes Mossad took these actions to quicken the transfer of 110,000 Jews in Iraq to the then newly created state of Israel.

Shlaim spoke to Novara Media about his latest book, Genocide in Gaza. He argues that in the 21st century apartheid is unsustainable in the long term and that Zionism is on the verge of collapse. Empires tend to become increasingly violent as they decline. When this period ends, Israel will be weakened internally and foreign support will diminish. This combination of factors is likely to lead to the collapse of Zionism and settler colonialism. Israel appears to be on a path toward self-destruction.

Lawyers acting on Hamas's behalf attached Shlaim's expert opinions to a request led by Hamas leader Mousa Abu Marzouk to the UK Home Office to remove Hamas from Britain's list of proscribed international terrorist organizations.

== Reception ==
Israeli historians Joseph Heller and Yehoshua Porath criticized Shlaim's book Lion of Jordan: The Political Biography of King Hussein, writing, "Shlaim's writing stems from a political agenda that is hostile to Israel [...] rather than from an objective examination of the Israeli narrative" and that he "misleads his readers with his claims that Israel missed the chance for peace".

According to Yoav Gelber, Shlaim concluded that the Jewish Agency and King Abdullah of Jordan agreed in 1946 to divide the land of Palestine between themselves and feigned a short war before implementing the agreement. Gelber wrote that the documentary evidence on the development of contacts between Israel and Jordan before, during, and after the 1948 war does not support Shlaim's conclusion. Marc Lynch wrote that "the voluminous evidence in [Gelber's] book does not allow so conclusive a verdict".

Israeli historian Benny Morris has praised Shlaim's historical works, such as Collusion Across the Jordan and The Iron Wall. Morris panned Israel and Palestine, which he said has an anti-Israel and pro-Arab bias, asserting that Shlaim distorted records to give a one-sided portrayal of history. Morris also panned Three Worlds: Memoirs of an Arab-Jew.

In a review for the Journal of Refugee Studies, Anne Irfan called Three Worlds: Memoirs of an Arab-Jew "a hybrid genre of political-social history, family history, and personal memoir" reminiscent of Rashid Khalidi's The Hundred Years' War on Palestine, with "striking similarities" to Edward Said's memoir Out of Place (1999). Irfan argued that the parallels between Said's and Shlaim's lives reinforce "the latter's contention that these two groups are both victims of the Zionist movement". Additionally, Irfan felt the book had "much to contribute to the field of Refugee and Forced Migration Studies" and offers "an instructive case study for thinking through the categories of migrant and refugee".

== Awards and recognition ==
In 2006, Shlaim was elected Fellow of the British Academy (FBA), the United Kingdom's national academy for the humanities and social sciences.

On 27 September 2017, Shlaim was awarded the British Academy Medal "for lifetime achievement".

Shlaim was the winner of the 2024 PEN Hessell-Tiltman Prize for Three Worlds: Memoirs of an Arab-Jew.

== Bibliography ==
- Shlaim, Avi (1988). Collusion across the Jordan: King Abdullah, the Zionist Movement, and the Partition of Palestine. Columbia University Press. ISBN 978-0231068383. OL 2402608M. (Winner of the 1988 Political Studies Association's W. J. M. Mackenzie Book Prize.)
- Shlaim, Avi (1990). The Politics of Partition: King Abdullah, the Zionists, and Palestine, 1921–1951. Oxford University Press. ISBN 978-0198294597. OL 82757M.
- Shlaim, Avi (1995). War and Peace in the Middle East: A Concise History. Penguin Books. ISBN 978-0140245646. OL 921594M.
- Shlaim, Avi; Sayigh, Yezid, eds. (1997). The Cold War and the Middle East. Clarendon Press. ISBN 978-0198290995. OL 991628M.
- Shlaim, Avi (1999). The Iron Wall: Israel and the Arab World. W. W. Norton & Company. ISBN 978-0713994100. OL 7451659M.
- Shlaim, Avi (2007). Lion of Jordan: The Life of King Hussein in War and Peace. Vintage. ISBN 978-1400078288. OL 24083636M.
- Shlaim, Avi (2009). Israel and Palestine: Reappraisals, Revisions, Refutations. Verso. ISBN 978-1844673667. OL 23913926M.
- Shlaim, Avi (2023). Three Worlds: Memoirs of an Arab-Jew. Oneworld Publications. ISBN 978-0861544639. OL 39565778M.
- Shlaim, Avi (2025). Genocide in Gaza: Israel's Long War on Palestine. Irish Pages. ISBN 978-1-7390902-2-7.

== See also ==
- "The bride is beautiful, but she is married to another man"
