= Zionism in Iraq =

Modern Zionism, the 19th century European ethnocultural nationalist movement to establish a Jewish state through the colonization of Palestine, started to slowly penetrate Iraq around the turn of the 20th century.

== History ==
Modern Zionist activity in Iraq began around 1898 with Aharon Sasson ibn Eliyahu Naḥum (c. 1872–1962) known as ha-moré (המורה 'the teacher'), the first Iraqi exponent of Zionism. In 1919, he made the first announcement of intent to establish a Zionist organization in Iraq in a letter from Baghdad to the Council of Delegates in Jaffa, with the goal of encouraging Jews to learn Hebrew and migrate to Palestine.

Although Jews of Iraq began to learn about the Zionist movement and the establishment of the Zionist Organization (ZO, known after 1960 as the World Zionist Organization) through newspapers and periodicals published in Hebrew in Europe and Palestine in the 19th century, Iraqi Jews only made contact with the ZO in 1913. Jews in Basra and Baghdad sought information from the Zionist movement and made donations to Zionist funds. By the end of 1913, Zionists in Basra opened a modern Hebrew language school. These activities ceased when Ottoman authorities forbade Zionist activity in World War I.

=== 1919–1935 ===
Zionist activity resumed after the war and the British occupation of Iraq. In 1920, a group of several dozen young Baghdadi Jews established an organization that would operate into the mid-1930s. With the assistance of the Jewish Agency, the Mesopotamian Zionist Committee (האגודה הבניונית לארם נהריים; الجمعية الصهيونية لبلاد النهرين) was established in Baghdad March 5, 1921. It operated in the club and library of the Jewish Literary Society (الجمعية الأدبية الإسرائيلية). Zionist associations were also established in Basra, ʿAmara, Hillah, Khanaqin, Kirkuk, and Irbil, and they operated freely though they did not have formal governmental recognition in Iraq. Although the Arab government delayed recognizing these Zionist associations, the British Colonial Office under John E. Shuckburgh, due to Zionist pressure, turned a blind eye to Zionist activity in Baghdad and Basra provided it remained discrete.

From 1919 to 1935, Zionists promoted ʿaliya, the migration to Palestine; collected donations to the Jewish National Fund and Keren Hayesod, especially through the sale of the Zionist shekel representing membership dues for the Zionist Organization; distributed ha-Olam, a publication in Hebrew that served as the mouthpiece of the Zionist Organization; and purchased land in Palestine. In the 1920s, Iraqi Jews contributed £52,220 sterling to Keren Hayesod and the Jewish National Fund—The majority of it was donated by Ezra Sasson Suheik—a high sum in proportion to the size of the Iraqi Jewish community. Some of this money financed the settlement of Kfar Yeḥezqeʾel and the Kadoorie Agricultural High School.

In 1935, with the massive Jewish immigration in Palestine leading up to the 1936–1939 Arab revolt in Palestine, the Kingdom of Iraq banned Zionist activity and these activities ceased. In January 1935, Aharon Sasson ibn Eliyahu Naḥum was forced to leave Iraq; he settled in Jerusalem.

In this period, Zionist youth organizations flourished in the country's Jewish schools. At the Shammash High School for Boys, for example, the Aḥiʿever Association promoted Hebrew, raised money for the Jewish National Fund, and prepared young Iraqi Jews for life and work in Palestine.

=== 1942–1952 ===
In 1942, after a 7-year pause, Zionist activities resumed, this time at the initiative of the Yishuv in Palestine and as an underground movement. The riots of June 1–2, 1941 known as the Farhūd, was a major impetus for the renewal of Zionist efforts in Iraq. Zionist institutions sent envoys called shelihim (שליחים; sing. shaliah שליח). Shaul Avigur (1899–1978) of the clandestine immigration organization Mossad LeAliyah Bet arrived in Baghdad March 1942 to make contacts with the Jewish community in Iraq. In April 1942, after Avigur returned to Palestine, Shmaryahu Gutman (1909–1996), Ezra Kadouri (1914–2000), and Enzo Sereni (1905–1944) were sent to Iraq to establish the underground HeHalutz movement (תנועה החלוץ, often called התנועה, 'the Movement') to prepare Iraqi Jews to migrate to Palestine.

== Sources ==
- Alroey, Gur (Fall 2011). ""Zionism without Zion"? Territorialist Ideology and the Zionist Movement, 1882–1956". Jewish Social Studies. 18 (1): 1–32. doi:10.2979/jewisocistud.18.1.1. JSTOR 10.2979/jewisocistud.18.1.1.
- Bloom, Etan (2011). Arthur Ruppin and the Production of Pre-Israeli Culture. Brill. ISBN 978-90-04-20379-2.
- Collins, John (2011). "A Dream Deterred: Palestine from Total War to Total Peace". In Bateman, Fiona (ed.). Studies in Settler Colonialism: Politics, Identity and Culture. London: Palgrave Macmillan UK. pp. 169–185. doi:10.1057/9780230306288_12. ISBN 978-0-230-30628-8.
- Jabotinsky, Ze'ev (November 4, 1923). "The Iron Wall" (PDF). Archived (PDF) from the original on May 9, 2024.
- Robinson, Shira (2013). Citizen Strangers: Palestinians and the Birth of Israel's Liberal Settler State. Stanford University Press. ISBN 978-0-804-78802-1.
