= List of ambassadors of Israel to Guinea =

== List of ambassadors ==
- Roi Rosenblit (Non-Resident, Dakar) 2018 -
- Paul Hirschson (Non-Resident, Dakar) 2015 - 2018
- Hagay Dikan 1961 - 1963
- Shlomo Hillel 1959 - 1961
