= Shlomo Hillel =

Israeli diplomat (1923–2021)

- שלמה הלל
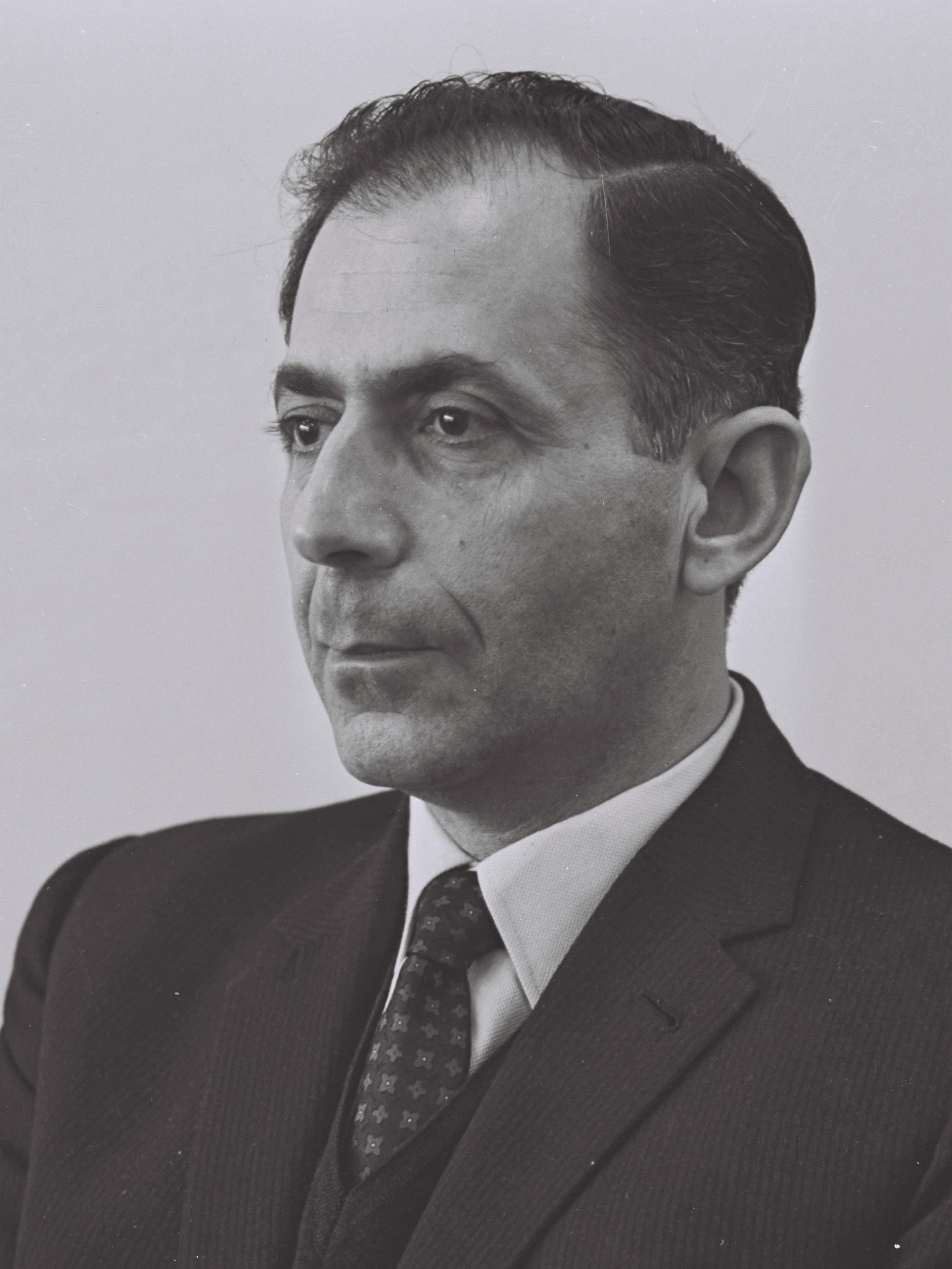
- Hillel in 1970

Speaker of the Knesset
- In office 11 September 1984 – 20 November 1988
- Preceded by: Menachem Savidor
- Succeeded by: Dov Shilansky

Ministerial roles
- 1969–1977: Minister of Police
- 1977: Minister of Internal Affairs

Faction represented in the Knesset
- 1952–1959: Mapai
- 1969–1991: Alignment
- 1991–1992: Labor Party

Other roles
- 1959–1961: Ambassador to Guinea
- 1961–1963: Ambassador to Ivory Coast, Upper Volta, Dahomey and Niger

Personal details
- Born: 9 April 1923 Baghdad, Mandatory Iraq
- Died: 8 February 2021 (aged 97)
- Awards: Israel Prize (1998)
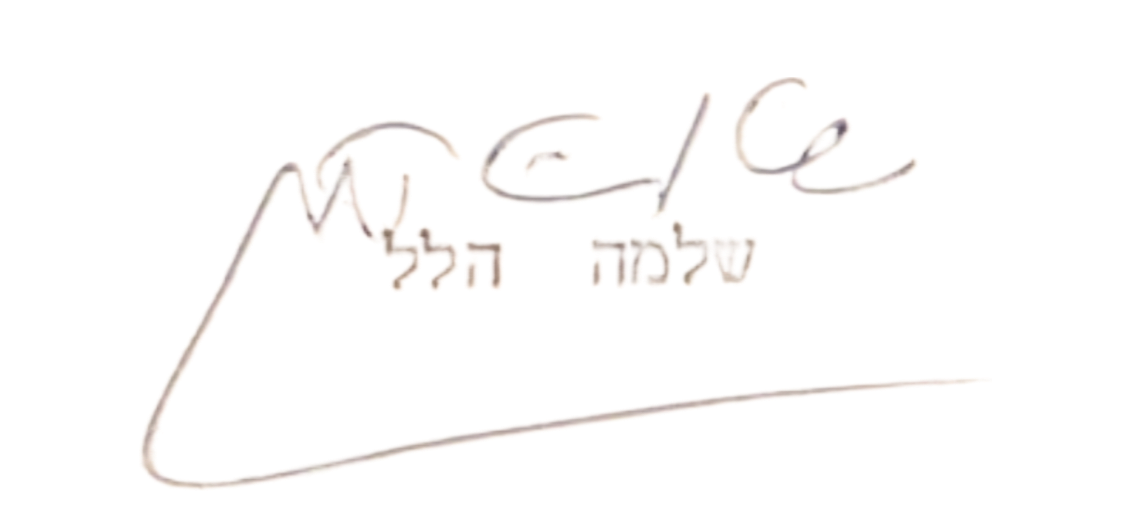
- Signature

Shlomo Hillel (Hebrew: שלמה הלל; 9 April 1923 – 8 February 2021) was an Israeli diplomat and politician who served as Speaker of the Knesset, Minister of Police, Minister of Internal Affairs, and ambassador to several countries in Africa. As an agent of the Mossad LeAliyah Bet in the late 1940s and early 1950s, he arranged the mass airlift of Iraqi Jews to Israel known as Operation Ezra and Nehemiah.

== Biography ==
Born to an Iraqi Jewish family in Baghdad, in Mandatory Iraq, Hillel immigrated to Mandatory Palestine with his family in 1934 at the age of eleven. After graduating from the Herzliya Hebrew High School in Tel Aviv, he underwent agricultural training in kibbutz Degania Alef, and later Pardes Hana. Hillel was secretary of a Hebrew Scouts group that later established Kibbutz Ma'agan Michael. In 1945, Hillel and his colleagues worked at a Haganah munitions factory disguised as a laundry facility in the basement of the Ayalon Institute in Rehovot. He studied political science, economics and public administration at the Hebrew University of Jerusalem. He married Temima, with whom he had two children, a son and a daughter. He lived in Ramat Denya, Jerusalem. Hillel's daughter Hagar was a pioneer in the research of Jewish journalism in the Arab world. He died on 8 February 2021.

== Zionist activism ==
=== Operation Michaelberg ===
In 1946, Hillel flew to Baghdad on an Iraqi passport and remained there for one year as an operative for the Zionist underground in Iraq. At that time, Iraqi Jews made aliyah to Israel through slow and treacherous overland routes facilitated by unreliable smugglers. Hillel spearheaded the first large-scale Iraqi aliyah by air, hiring two American pilots and a C-46 to fly 100 Iraqi Jews to Israel in what later became known as Operation Michaelberg. The flight was conducted in secret both to avoid detection by Iraqi authorities upon departure from Baghdad and to avoid detection by British authorities on arrival in Mandatory Palestine.

=== Operation Ezra and Nehemiah ===
Hillel visited Baghdad again in 1950 to negotiate the mass immigration of the Jews of Iraq, 120,000 of whom were airlifted to Israel in Operation Ezra and Nehemiah between 1950 and 1952. On these trips, he disguised himself as either a Frenchman or an Englishman. The airlift was made possible through the cooperation of Iran, which was a close ally of Israel at the time.

Hillel's partner was Ronnie Barnett, a British Jew who worked for Transocean Air Lines. While organizing pilgrimages to Mecca, Barnett met the director of a travel agency called Iraq Tours, Abdul Rahman Raouf. Barnett and Raouf met in Rome and Hillel came along as "Richard Armstrong." Raouf realized that there was money to be made in transporting the Jews out of Iraq, and arranged for the two to meet with the prime minister of Iraq, Tawfiq al-Suwaidi, who was a board member of his company. They visited the prime minister at his home. Al-Suwaidi complained that the illegal emigration of the Jews was harming Iraq because they were probably smuggling out property and leaving without paying their taxes. According to his estimates, at least 60,000 Jews would leave the country if they could. They agreed on a ticket price of 12 dinars (about $48) per ticket.

== Political and diplomatic career ==
For the 1951 Knesset elections Hillel was given a place on the Mapai list. Although he failed to win a seat, he entered the Knesset on 21 December 1952 as a replacement for the deceased Eliyahu Hacarmeli. He was re-elected in 1955, but resigned from the Knesset shortly before the 1959 elections, after which he joined the foreign service, and was appointed ambassador to Guinea in 1959. In 1961 he became ambassador to the Côte d'Ivoire, Dahomey, Republic of Upper Volta, and Niger, before becoming a member of the Israeli Delegation to the United Nations between 1963 and 1967. He returned to Israel in 1967, serving as the Deputy Director of the Ministry of Foreign Affairs until 1969.

In 1969, Hillel returned to the Knesset on the Alignment list. He served consecutively from the 1969 elections until the 1992 elections, in which he lost his seat. He was Minister of Police between 1969 and 1977, and Interior Minister in 1974 and 1977. In 1984 he was elected Speaker of the eleventh Knesset.

== Awards and recognition ==
In 1988, Hillel was awarded the Israel Prize, for his special contribution to the society and the State of Israel.

He was president of the Society for Preservation of Israel Heritage Sites.

== Published works ==
In 1984, Hillel published Operation Babylon: The Story of the Rescue of the Jews of Iraq, a memoir of the operation, which was later translated into English, French, German, Spanish, Portuguese, Russian and Arabic.

== See also ==
- List of Israel Prize recipients
- 1950-1951 Baghdad bombings
