= Orit Bashkin =

Professor of Middle Eastern history

Orit Bashkin is a historian and a professor in the Department of Middle Eastern Studies at the University of Chicago. She is the Mabel Greene Myers Professor of Modern Middle Eastern History.

== Career ==
Bashkin received her B.A. and M.A. degrees in 1995 and 1999 from Tel Aviv University, and her Ph.D. from Princeton University in 2004. As of 2023 she is the Mabel Greene Myers Professor of Modern Middle Eastern History. Bashkin began her research on Iraq in the mid-1990s.

== Works ==
- Bashkin, Orit (2009). The Other Iraq: Pluralism and Culture in Hashemite Iraq. Stanford University Press.
- Bashkin, Orit (2012). New Babylonians: A History of Jews in Modern Iraq. Stanford University Press.
- Bashkin, Orit (2017). Impossible Exodus: Iraqi Jews in Israel. Stanford University Press.
