= Joseph Heller (historian) =

Israeli historian

Joseph Heller, transcribed also as Yosef Heller (Hebrew: יוסף הלר; born January 6, 1937), is an Israeli historian. He is Professor Emeritus at the Hebrew University in Jerusalem. He was born in Tel Aviv.

== Published works ==
- The Birth of Israel, 1945–1949: Ben-Gurion and his critics, (2000), University of Florida Press, ISBN 0813017327
- The Stern Gang: ideology, politics, and terror, 1940–1949 (1995)
- British Policy towards the Ottoman Empire, 1908–1914 (1983) ISBN 0-7146-3127-2
- The Struggle for the Jewish State: Zionist Politics, 1936—1948, The Zalman Shazar Center For The Furtherance Of The Study Of Jewish History, Jerusalem, 1984. (Be-maʼavaḳ la-medinah. Yerushalayim : Merkaz Zalman Shazar le-haʻamaḳat ha-todaʻah ha-hisṭorit ha-Yehudit, 1984) 560 pages. A Collection of documents by various authors, in Hebrew. ISBN 965-227-021-0 OCLC 24064867 and OCLC 959578132
- The United States, the Soviet Union and the Arab-Israeli conflict, 1948–67 Superpower rivalry, Manchester University Press, 2016. 304 pages. The Cold War context, based on extensive analysis of rare documents. ISBN 978-1-5261-0382-6
