= Esther Meir-Glitzenstein =

Israeli academic, researcher of Jews in the Arab world (born 1954)

Esther Meir-Glitzenstein (Hebrew: אסתר מאיר-גליצנשטיין; born 1954, Israel) is a professor at the Ben-Gurion University of the Negev. She specializes in the history of Jews from Arab countries in the 20th century.

== Books ==
- Zionism and the Jews of Iraq, 1941-1950, Tel-Aviv: Tel Aviv University and Am-Oved Publishers, 1993. 328 pp.
- Zionism in an Arab Country: Jews in Iraq in the 1940s, London and New York: Routledge, 2004. 285 pp. Book Cover
- Between Baghdad and Ramat-Gan: Iraqi Jews in Israel, Jerusalem: Yad Ben Zvi Publishers, 2009. 420 pp.
- The Exodus of the Yemenite Jews: Failed Operation and Formative Myth, Resling Publishers, Tel Aviv 2012. 340 pp.
- The “Magic Carpet” Exodus of Yemenite Jewry: An Israeli Formative Myth, Sussex Academic Press, 2014. 256 pp.
- Beer Sheva: Metropolis in the Making, Beer Sheva: Ben Gurion University Publishers, 2008. 333 pp.
- Development Towns in Israel, Jerusalem: Yad Ben Zvi Publishers, 2009. 449 pp.
