= Iraqi Jewish Archive =

Collection of historical documents

The Iraqi Jewish Archive, also known as the Iraqi Mukhabarat Archive, is a collection of 2,700 books and tens of thousands of historical documents from Iraq's Jewish community found by the United States Army in the basement of Saddam Hussein's intelligence headquarters during the US invasion of Iraq in 2003.

The collection includes a wide variety of books and rare documents, ranging from 500-year-old commentaries on the Talmud, personal letters sent during the 1950s, and centuries-old holy books. These materials were abandoned during Operation Ezra and Nehemiah, when almost all Iraqi Jews made aliyah to Israel on the condition (imposed by the Iraqi government) that they leave their property behind. The Intelligence Agency of the Iraqi regime subsequently seized these books and documents from synagogues and Jewish community institutions in a way that recalled similar looting by the Nazis during World War II, eventually storing them in the basement where they would be found by the US Army.

The archive has been in temporary US custody since 2003, and is scheduled to be transferred permanently to Iraq. This plan is controversial: some Middle-East scholars and Jewish organizations have opined that because the materials were abandoned during Iraqi Jews' forced mass emigration in the early 1950s, and because almost no Jews live in Iraq today, the archive should instead be housed in Israel or the United States.

== Discovery and preservation ==
The archive was found by the United States Army in May 2003 in a flooded basement in Baghdad once housing Saddam Hussein's secret police headquarters in Baghdad. It was rescued due to a book freezing process on special trucks. With the consent of the provisional Iraqi government, the archive was transferred to National Archives and Records Administration (NARA) facilities in Texas and Maryland. If the United States had not rescued the documents, they would have been irretrievably lost to water damage and mold.

Because the collection did not belong to the U.S. government, the NARA could not use appropriated funds for its full conservation, cataloging, and digitization, requiring private fundraising through a partnership with the Center for Jewish History, which received a $94,000 grant from the National Endowment for the Humanities to begin the work. The limited funding left much of the conservation and digitization incomplete as the initial two-year loan period approached expiration. Iraqi State Board of Antiquities and Heritage director Donny George agreed that the collection could remain in the United States beyond the original loan period for continued restoration. At a cost of $3 million, the archive was digitized and is fully available online. Subsequent access projects include Voices from the Archive, a JIMENA-fiscally sponsored platform developed by David Breslauer that uses artificial intelligence to generate searchable transcriptions and English translations of the digitized collection.

The documents are written in Hebrew, Arabic, Judeo-Arabic, and English. Certain irreparably damaged kosher scrolls (such as Torah scrolls and scrolls containing the Book of Esther) were ritually buried in accordance with Jewish law.

== Debate over return to Iraq ==
The US National Archives' custody of the Iraqi Jewish Archive is temporary, and the United States is contractually obligated to return the collection to Iraq. This has engendered some opposition on the grounds that the collection rightfully belongs to Iraqi Jews, almost none of whom currently reside in Iraq. Harold Rhode, a Middle East specialist formerly at The Pentagon who was present when the collection was found, has suggested that it should be placed permanently in Israel.

In February 2014 the United States Senate unanimously passed a resolution calling on President Barack Obama to reopen new negotiations over the agreement on the archive return to Iraq. In May of the same year, the governments of the United States and Iraq had reached an agreement that most of the items of the archive would remain in the United States until September 2018. In September 2017, the State Department said it would not seek to further extend the agreement, but in July 2018 reversed course and announced that it would work with the Iraqi government to delay the return of the archive.In April 2026, the books were still store in the United States.
