= Wilbur Crane Eveland =

Central Intelligence Agency officer

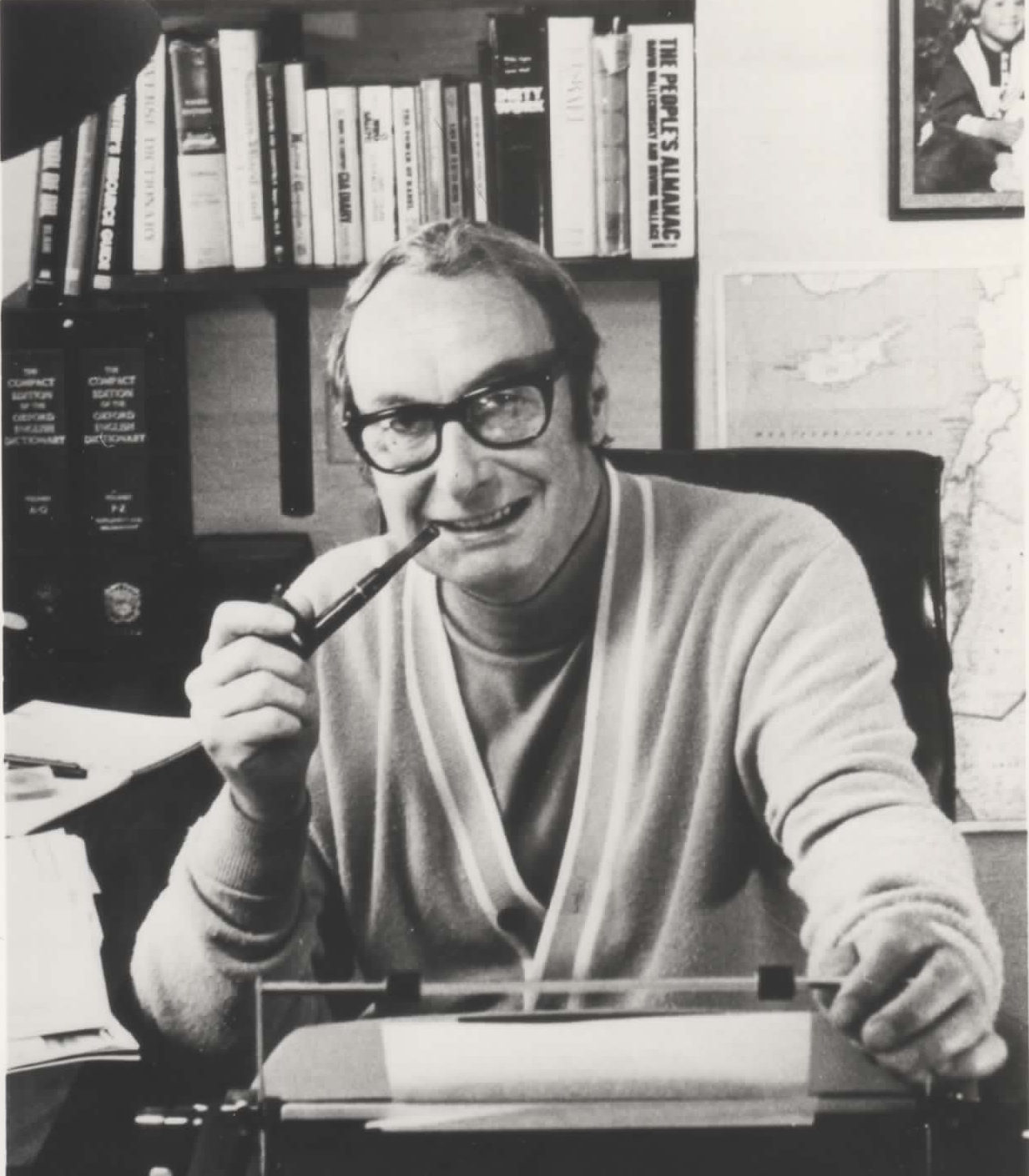
Bill Eveland circa 1978

Wilbur Crane "Bill" Eveland III (July 1, 1918 – January 2, 1990) was a World War II veteran, a CIA station chief, and critic of U.S. foreign policy in the Middle East. Known for his work with the CIA in the Middle East, his autobiographical book, Ropes of Sand (1980), details the many failures of the CIA vis-a-vis the Middle East during the Cold War.

== Life ==
Wilbur Crane Eveland III was born on July 1, 1918, in Spokane, Washington. Eveland then took classes at the University of California, Berkeley, and Harvard University.

In 1940, Eveland joined the United States Army, where in January 1941 he was recruited as an agent for the Corps of Intelligence Police, later known as the Counter Intelligence Corps. He was put in charge of the Counter Intelligence Corps field offices in Panama and held several other intelligence positions until 1948, when he decided to become a military attaché.

As preparation for work as a military attaché, Eveland took a one-year course in Arabic at the Army Language School (now the Defense Language Institute), after which he was stationed at the American Embassy in Baghdad, Iraq, from 1950 to 1952. Upon returning to the United States, Eveland was appointed as the Near East intelligence specialist for the Office of the Assistant Chief of Staff of the Department of the Army.

Throughout the 1950s, Eveland worked for several United States government agencies. From 1953 to 1954, he organized and headed the Near East and African Branch of the Office of Foreign Military Affairs within the Office of the Secretary of Defense. While in this position, Eveland was one of two officers to meet with Gamal Abdel Nasser to discuss aid to Egypt. In 1955, Eveland became a consultant to the Operations Coordinating Board, an entity responsible for monitoring implementation of National Security Council policies, reviewing proposals for clandestine political actions abroad, and reviewing covert CIA expenditures (Ropes of Sand, p. 110).

Upon returning from this assignment, Eveland was recruited into the CIA, where he worked closely with Allen Dulles.

From 1955 to 1959, Eveland was assigned to the American embassies in Damascus, Syria, and Beirut, Lebanon as a CIA agent using Department of State cover. During this time, Eveland completed several missions in Syria, some involving coup attempts, including a mission to deliver half a million pounds to Syrian politician Mikhail Ilyan that Eveland completed shortly before the beginning of the combined British-French-Israeli attack on Egypt, commonly called the Suez Crisis. Eveland participated in joint United States and United Kingdom planning sessions and also served as the contact person for Camille Chamoun, President of Lebanon.

From 1959 to 1961, Eveland was on CIA assignment to Rome, Italy, under cover as a Vinnell Corporation engineering company executive in charge of petroleum related construction, maintenance, and training projects in the Middle East and Africa. In 1962, he resigned from the CIA to become the vice president of Vinnell, although he was retained as an unpaid consultant to the CIA to maintain his security clearances. In the 1970s, Eveland worked as a consultant for various companies in the petroleum industry.

Eveland decided to write a book documenting American policy in the Middle East while watching the port of Beirut burn at the start of the Lebanese Civil War in 1975. The contract for Ropes of Sand: America's Failure in the Middle East was signed in 1977. Publication was delayed when the CIA requested a prepublication review of the work, but when the agency later chose not to examine the book, Eveland published the work in 1980. Eveland died in 1990.

== CIA Lawsuit ==
In 1986 Eveland sued the CIA and its director at the time, William J. Casey over the conduct of the United States Government and its policies in the Middle East. Others named in the suit included Richard Helms, William E. Colby, Kermit Roosevelt Sr., Archibald B. Roosevelt, Henry Kissinger, Robert McFarlane, James J. Angleton and George P. Shultz. The suit was dismissed in April 1988.
