= Arthur Neslen =

Arthur Neslen is a British-born journalist and author. Nelsen has especially covered Middle East issues, fossil lobbies' influence on European institutions and climate change. He served as journalist for Haaretz, Jane's Information Group, The Observer, The Guardian, and as a correspondent for the websites of The Economist and al-Jazeera. NGOs credited policy changes at the European commission, international financial institutions and wildlife regulatory agencies in part to Neslen's work.

== Career ==
Neslen began his career at the City Limits magazine and worked as the international editor of for Red Pepper and as a broadcast journalist for the BBC.

In 1990, Neslen was hospitalised after a serious assault at a London tube station. Fascist activist Tony Lecomber was eventually convicted of the assault, and jailed for three years.

Neslen wrote two books about identity in the Middle East. Occupied Minds: A Journey Through the Israeli Psyche was published by Pluto Press in 2006 and In Your Eyes A Sandstorm: Ways of Being Palestinian was published by University of California Press in October, 2011. He is also the author of the booklet Gaza: Dignity Under Siege which was published by CIDSE (International Co-operation for Development and Solidarity) in 2009. All three are collections of interviews and photographs.

In 2009, while taking photographs for In Your Eyes a Sandstorm, Neslen was attacked with a knife in a Gaza street. Two years later, he returned to Gaza to meet the attacker, a young Palestinian diagnosed as schizophrenic.

After moving to Brussels, Neslen began working for The Guardian in 2014 as the paper's Europe environment correspondent, where he contributed to its award-winning Keep it in the ground campaign.

His investigative reports often focused on how EU climate policy had been influenced by lobbying from fossil fuel majors including BP, Shell, Chevron, Exxon and others acting in concert. One report showed how US officials had pressured the EU into weakening pesticides regulations, in negotiations over the aborted TTIP trade deal.

Other stories that he broke included the European Food Safety Authority's use of an EU report that copy and pasted analyses from a Monsanto study to justify a recommendation for relicensing glyphosate. The story was later vindicated by a cross-party inquiry in the European parliament.

He is currently a senior reporter for Politico.
