= Mordechai Ben-Porat =

Israeli politician (1923–2022)

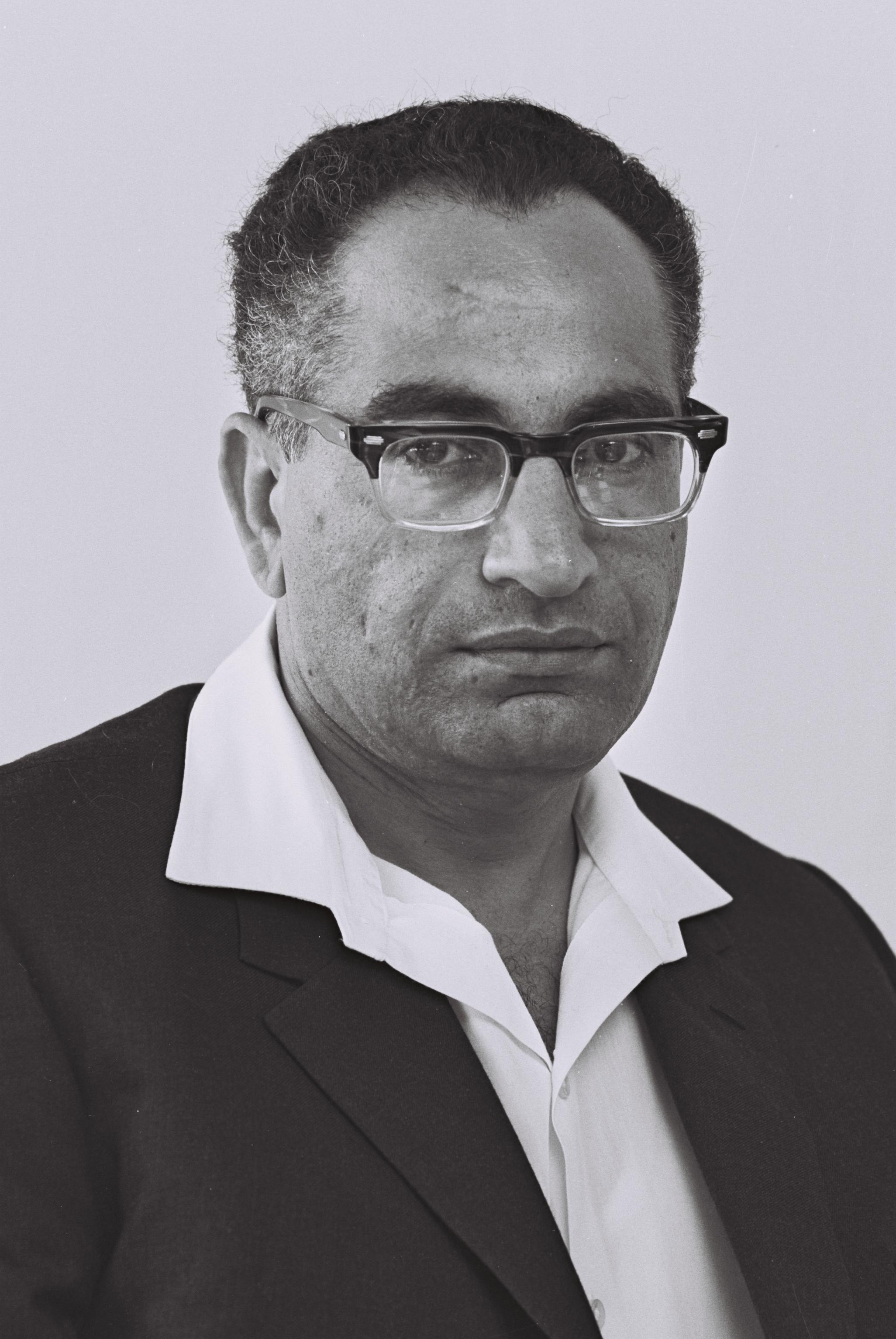
- Ben-Porat in 1965

Ministerial roles
- 1982–1984: Minister without Portfolio

Faction represented in the Knesset
- 1965–1968: Rafi
- 1968–1969: Labor Party
- 1969–1977: Alignment
- 1981–1983: Telem
- 1983–1984: Movement for the Renewal of Social Zionism

Personal details
- Born: 12 September 1923 Baghdad, Iraq
- Died: 3 January 2022 (aged 98)

Mordechai Ben-Porat (Hebrew: מרדכי בן-פורת, Arabic: مردخاي بن بورات; 12 September 1923 – 3 January 2022) was an Israeli politician who served as a member of the Knesset in two spells between 1965 until 1984, and as Minister without Portfolio from July 1982 until January 1984. During his four terms in the Knesset, he represented five different parties.

== Biography ==
Born Murad Murad in Baghdad in Iraq to a Jewish family, Ben-Porat was the oldest of eleven children of Regina and Nessim Yehezkel Murad; when he reached school age, his father changed the family name to Kazzazz (meaning "silk trader", which was the profession of Ben-Porat's grandfather).

Ben-Porat survived the Farhud in 1941. He emigrated to Mandatory Palestine in 1945. He joined the Haganah in 1947 and fought in the 1948 Arab–Israeli War. He helped organise the mass immigration of Iraqi Jews between 1949 and 1951, during which he was arrested four times by the Iraqi authorities. He later studied political science at the Tel Aviv adjunct of the Hebrew University of Jerusalem, and administration at Tel Aviv University.

A member of Mapai, in 1955 he became head of Or Yehuda's local council, a post he held until 1969. When David Ben-Gurion left Mapai to found Rafi, Porat followed him. In 1965 he was elected to the Knesset on Rafi's list. During the Knesset term the party merged into the Labor Party, which then became part of the Alignment. He was re-elected on the Alignment list in 1969 and between 1970 and 1972 served as the Labor Party's deputy secretary.

He was re-elected again in 1973, but on 15 March 1977 left the party to sit as an independent MK. He subsequently lost his seat in the May 1977 elections. In 1979 he was involved with the Jewish Agency's efforts to help Jews leave Iran.

In 1981 he joined the new Telem party, and was elected to the Knesset on its list in the elections that year. In July 1982 he was appointed Minister without Portfolio. On 6 June 1983, Telem split and Ben-Porat established the Movement for the Renewal of Social Zionism. He remained in the cabinet until 31 January 1984, and lost his seat in the elections that year. He joined Likud in 1988.

Ben-Porat died on 3 January 2022, at the age of 98. His daughter, Idit married the Israeli entrepreneur, author, illustrator, and footballer Isaak Hayik.

In Or Yehuda, a street was named after him during his lifetime. In 2023 "Ben Porat Avenue" was inaugurated in Ramat Shekma neighborhood in Ramat Gan.

== Awards ==
In 2001 Ben-Porat was awarded the Israel Prize for his lifetime achievements and special contribution to society and the State of Israel, in particular for his role in rescuing the Jews of Iraq.

== See also ==
- List of Israel Prize recipients
