= Operation Ezra and Nehemiah =

1951–1952 airlift of Iraqi Jews to Israel

Operation Ezra and Nehemiah was an operation conducted by Israel and the American Jewish Joint Distribution Committee that airlifted between 120,000 and 130,000 Iraqi Jews to Israel via Iran and Cyprus from 1951 to 1952. The massive emigration of Iraqi Jews was among the most climactic events of the Jewish exodus from the Muslim World.

The operation is named after Ezra and Nehemiah, who led groups of Jews from exile in Babylonia to return to Judea in the 5th century BC, as written in the books of the Hebrew Bible that bear their names.

Most of the $4 million cost of the operation was financed by the American Jewish Joint Distribution Committee.

The original code name for the operation was Operation Ali Baba. Contemporaneous reporting used this name.

== Background ==
=== 1940s ===
A change in Iraqi Jewish identity occurred after the violent Farhud against the Jews of Baghdad, on June 1–2, 1941 following the collapse of the Golden Square regime of Rashid Ali al-Kaylani, during which at least 180 Jews were killed during two days of pogrom mob attacks in the community. In some accounts the Farhud marked the turning point for Iraq's Jews. Other historians, however, see the pivotal moment for the Iraqi Jewish community much later, between 1948 and 1951, since Jewish communities prospered along with the rest of the country throughout most of the 1940s, many Jews who left Iraq following the Farhud returned to the country shortly thereafter, and permanent emigration did not accelerate significantly until 1950–51. Either way, the Farhud is broadly understood to mark the start of a process of politicization of the Iraqi Jews in the 1940s, primarily among the younger population, especially as a result of the impact it had on hopes of long term integration into Iraqi society. In the direct aftermath of the Farhud, many joined the Iraqi Communist Party in order to protect the Jews of Baghdad, yet they did not want to leave the country and rather sought to fight for better conditions in Iraq itself. At the same time the Iraqi government that had taken over after the Farhud reassured the Iraqi Jewish community, and normal life soon returned to Baghdad, which saw a marked betterment of its economic situation during World War II.

In the first half of the 1940s, Mossad LeAliyah Bet began sending emissaries to Iraq to begin to organize emigration to Israel, initially by recruiting people to teach Hebrew and hold lectures on Zionism. In late 1942, one of the emissaries explained the size of their task of converting the Iraqi community to Zionism, writing that "we have to admit that there is not much point in [organizing and encouraging emigration].... We are today eating the fruit of many years of neglect, and what we didn't do can't be corrected now through propaganda and creating one-day-old enthusiasm." In addition, the Iraqi people were incited against Zionism by propaganda campaigns in the press, initiated by Nuri al-Said. The Iraqi Jewish Leaders had expressed anti-Zionist statements during the 1930, but in 1944, they boldly and vehemently refused a similar request. They did so as a protest against the authorities’ treatment of Jewish community and not because they had changed their minds about Zionism. According to one estimate, of Iraq's 130,000 Jews, only 1.53% (2,000) were Zionists. The situation of the Jews was perceived by some to be increasingly risky as the decision on the fate of Palestine approached,

=== Following Israeli independence ===
With the affirmation of the 1947 Partition Plan for Palestine, and Israeli Independence in 1948, the Jews began to feel that their lives were in danger. "Immediately after the establishment of the State of Israel, the Iraqi government adopted a policy of anti-Jewish discrimination, mass dismissals from government service, and arrests." Jews working in government jobs were dismissed, and hundreds were arrested for Zionist or Communist activity, whether actual or merely alleged, tried in military courts, and were given harsh prison sentences or heavily fined. Nuri al-Said admitted that the Iraqi Jews were victims of bad treatment.

On October 23, 1948, Shafiq Ades, a respected Jewish businessman, was publicly hanged in Basra on charges of selling weapons to Israel and the Iraqi Communist Party, an event that increased the sense of insecurity among Jews. During this period, the Iraqi Jewish community became increasingly fearful. The Jewish community general sentiment was that if a man as well-connected and powerful as Shafiq Ades could be eliminated by the state, other Jews could no longer be assured of safety.

Like most Arab League states, Iraq initially forbade the emigration of its Jews after the 1948 war on the grounds that allowing them to go to Israel would strengthen that state; however, by 1949 the Iraqi Zionist underground was smuggling Jews out of the country to Iran at about a rate of 1,000 a month, from where they were flown to Israel. At the time, the British believed that the Zionist underground was agitating in Iraq in order to assist US fund-raising and to "offset the bad impression caused by the Jewish attitudes to Arab refugees".

The Iraqi government took in only 4,000 of the 246,000 Palestinians who left the country during the 1948–49 war, and refused to submit to American and British pressure to admit more. In January 1949, the pro-British Iraqi Prime Minister Nuri al-Said discussed the idea of deporting Iraqi Jews to Israel with British officials, who explained that such a proposal would benefit Israel and adversely affect Arab countries. According to Meir-Glitzenstein, such suggestions were "not intended to solve either the problem of the Palestinian Arab refugees or the problem of the Jewish minority in Iraq, but to torpedo plans to resettle Palestinian Arab refugees in Iraq". In July 1949, the British government proposed to Nuri al-Said a population exchange in which Iraq would agree to settle 100,000 Palestinian refugees in Iraq; Nuri stated that if a fair arrangement could be agreed, "the Iraqi government would permit a voluntary move by Iraqi Jews to Palestine." The Iraqi-British proposal was reported in the press in October 1949. On October 14, 1949, Nuri al-Said raised the exchange of population concept with the economic mission survey. At the Jewish Studies Conference in Melbourne in 2002, Philip Mendes summarised the effect of al-Said's vacillations on Jewish expulsion as: "In addition, the Iraqi Prime Minister Nuri al-Said tentatively canvassed and then shelved the possibility of expelling the Iraqi Jews, and exchanging them for an equal number of Palestinian Arabs."

== Reversal: permitting Jewish emigration ==
In March 1950, the Iraqi government reversed their earlier ban on Jewish emigration to Israel and passed a special bill of one-year duration permitting Jewish emigration on condition that Jews renounce their Iraqi citizenship. According to Abbas Shiblak, many scholars state that this was a result of British, American and Israeli political pressure on Tawfiq al-Suwaidi's government, with some studies suggesting there were secret negotiations. According to Ian Black, the Iraqi government was motivated by "economic considerations, chief of which was that almost all the property of departing Jews reverted to the state treasury" and also that "Jews were seen as a restive and potentially troublesome minority that the country was best rid of." At first, few would register, as the Zionist movement suggested they not do so until property issues and legal status had been clarified. After mounting pressure from both Jews and the Government, the movement relented and agreed to registrations.

Immediately following the March 1950 Denaturalisation Act, the emigration movement faced significant challenges. Initially, local Zionist activists forbade the Iraqi Jews from registering for emigration with the Iraqi authorities, because the Israeli government was still discussing absorption planning. However, on April 8, 1950, a bomb exploded in a Jewish cafe in Baghdad. A meeting of the Zionist leadership later that day agreed to allow registration without waiting for the Israeli government. A proclamation encouraging registration was made throughout Iraq in the name of the State of Israel. At the same time, immigrants were also entering Israel from Poland and Romania, countries in which Prime Minister David Ben-Gurion assessed there was a risk that the Communist authorities would soon "close their gates", and Israel therefore delayed the transportation of Iraqi Jews. According to Esther Meir-Glitzenstein, "The thousands of poor Jews who had left or been expelled from the peripheral cities, and who had gone to Baghdad to wait for their opportunity to emigrate, were in an especially bad state. They were housed in public buildings and were being supported by the Jewish community. The situation was intolerable." The delay became a significant problem for the Iraqi government of Nuri al-Said (who replaced Tawfiq al-Suwaidi in mid-September 1950), as the large number of Jews "in limbo" created problems politically, economically and for domestic security. "Particularly infuriating" to the Iraqi government was that the source of the problem was the Israeli government.

As a result of these developments, al-Said was determined to drive the Jews out of his country as quickly as possible. On 21 August 1950 al-Said threatened to revoke the license of the company transporting the Jewish exodus if it did not fulfill its daily quota of 500 Jews, and in September 1950, he summoned a representative of the Jewish community and warned the Jewish community of Baghdad to make haste; otherwise, he would take the Jews to the borders himself. On 12 October 1950, Nuri al-Said summoned a senior official of the transport company and made similar threats, justifying the expulsion of Jews by the number of Palestinian Arabs fleeing from Israel.

According to Gat, it is highly likely that one of Nuri as-Said's motives in trying to expel large numbers of Jews was the desire to aggravate Israel's economic problems (he had declared as such to the Arab world), although Nuri was well aware that the absorption of these immigrants was the policy on which Israel based its future. The Iraqi Minister of Defence told the U.S. ambassador that he had reliable evidence that the emigrating Jews were involved in activities injurious to the state and were in contact with communist agents.

The emigration law was to expire in March 1951, one year after the law was enacted. At first, the Iraqi emigration law allowed the Jews to sell their property and liquidate their businesses. On 10 March 1951, 64,000 Iraqi Jews were still waiting to emigrate, the government enacted a new law which extended the emigration period whilst also blocking the assets of Jews who had given up their citizenship. Departing Jews were permitted to take no more than $140 and 66 pounds of luggage out of the country, and were also prohibited from taking jewelry with them.

== Baghdad bombings ==
Between April 1950 and June 1951, Jewish targets in Baghdad were struck five times. There has been much debate in the postwar years as to whether the bombs were planted by the Mossad to encourage Iraqi Jews to emigrate to Israel or if they were planted by Muslim extremists to help drive out the Jews. This has been the subject of lawsuits and inquiries in Israel.

Iraqi authorities eventually rounded up all 21 members of a Zionist underground cell, and, among them put three members on trial and sentenced two—Shalom Salah Shalom and Yosef Ibrahim Basri—to death. Traces of TNT identical to that used in some explosions were found in the latter's car. He made his confession after a month of torture. The third man, Yehuda Tajar, was sentenced to 10 years in prison. In May and June 1951, following indications provided by Shalom Salah Shalom and a map found in the home of another underground member, Yusef Khabaza, arms caches were discovered that belonged to the Zionist underground. In his 2023 memoir Avi Shlaim, a historian of Iraqi-Jewish origins, argues that of the 5 bombings, three were planted by a member of the Zionist underground in Baghdad, Yusef Ibrahim Basri, basing his conclusion on the testimony of Yaacov Karkoukli. Karkoukli had been recruited by Isser Harel during a visit to Mandatory Palestine in the 1940s. Basri in this account obtained TNT and grenades from Max Binnet. The synagogue bombing was carried out by a Sunni crook, Salih al-Haidari, who was motivated by a desire to avenge himself against Jews who had reported his attempt to defraud them, but who had been persuaded to do so by Salem al-Quraishi, a captain in the Special Division of the Baghdad City Police Directorate who had been bribed by Zionists. One of the five incidents, at Dar al-Beyda, has been traced to Istiqlal militants under the direction of Adnan al-Rawi. When news of the hangings reached the displaced Iraqi Jewish community in Israel, it evoked no significant commemoration. Rather the widespread sentiment was that their fate was an act of God to punish the agents of the Iraqi Jewish community's dispossession.

== Airlift ==
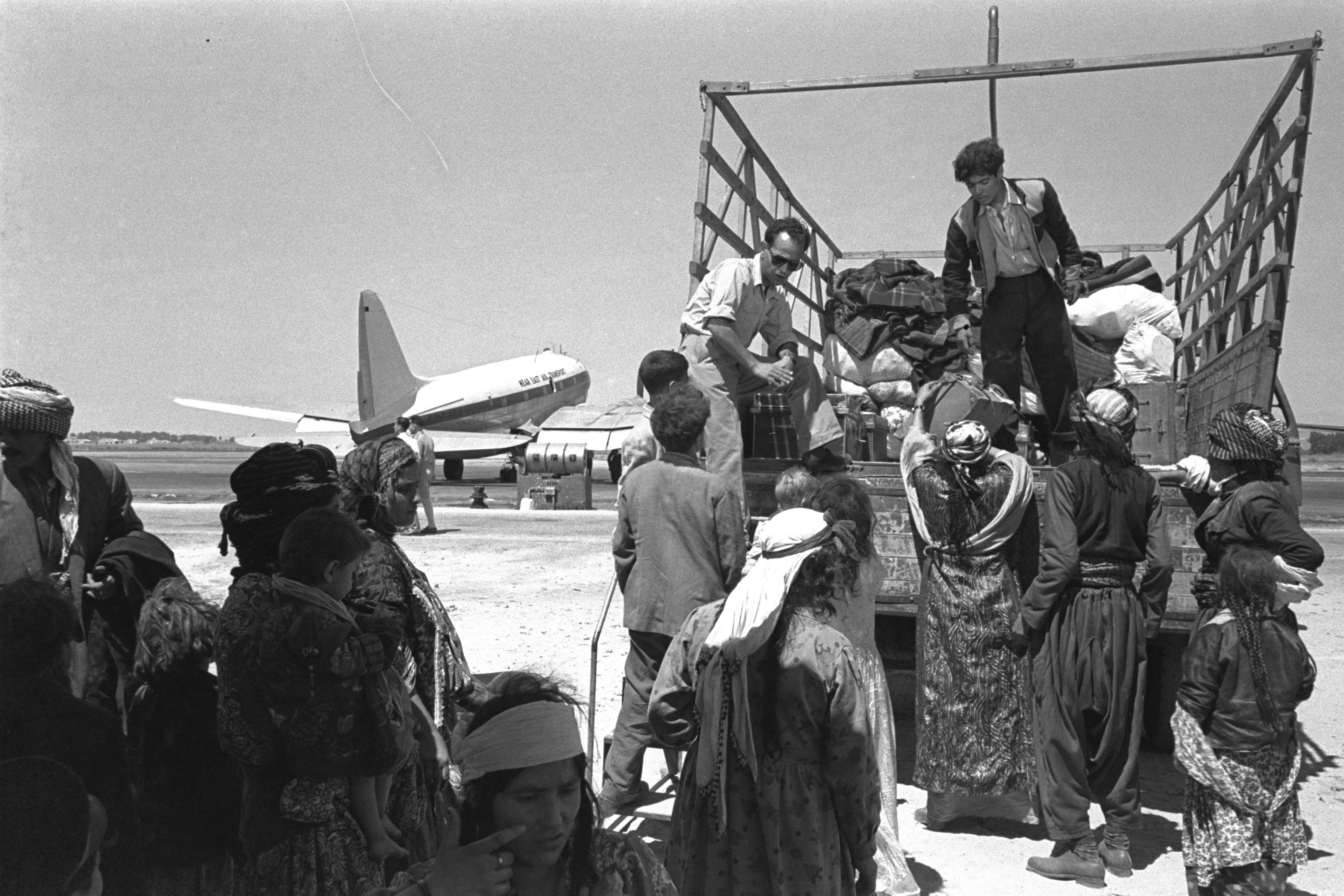
Immigrants from Iraq leaving Lod airport on their way to ma'abara, 1951

In March 1951, the Israeli government organized an airlift operation. Waiting in Baghdad was a tense and difficult period. Some 50,000 Jews signed up in one month, and two months later there were 90,000 on the list. This mass movement stunned the Iraqi government, which had not expected the number of immigrants to exceed 8,000, and feared that administrative institutions run by Jews might collapse. At the same time, the Zionist movement issued a manifesto calling on the Jews to sign up for immigration. It started with the following: "O, Zion, flee, daughter of Babylon," and concluded thus: "Jews! Israel is calling you — come out of Babylon!".

The operation was conducted by the Near East Transport Company and the Israeli national airline El Al. The Near East Transport Company had been founded in 1950 by James Wooten, who as president of Alaska Airlines had directed the airlift of Yemenite Jews in Operation Magic Carpet. The flights began in mid-May 1951, when Iraqi Jews were airlifted to Cyprus, from where they were flown to Israel. Several months later, a giant airlift operated directly from Baghdad to Lod Airport. Operation Ezra and Nehemiah ended in early 1952, leaving only about 6,000 Jews in Iraq. Most of the 2,800-year-old Jewish community immigrated to Israel.

== Aftermath ==
Until Operation Ezra and Nehemiah, there were 28 Jewish educational institutions in Baghdad, 16 under the supervision of the community committee and the rest privately run. The number of pupils reached 12,000 and many others learned in foreign and government schools. About 400 students studied medicine, law, economics, pharmacy, and engineering. In 1951, the Jewish school for the blind was closed; it was the only school of its type in Baghdad. The Jews of Baghdad had two hospitals in which the poor received free treatment, and several philanthropic services. Out of sixty synagogues in 1950, there remained only seven after 1970. Most public buildings were seized by the government for paltry or no compensation. Those Jewish refugees have been fed, housed and absorbed by Israel.

After the initial emigration, the number of Jews in Baghdad decreased from 100,000 to 5,000. Although they enjoyed a brief period of security during the reign of Abdul Karim Qassim, later regimes would seriously increase the persecution of Iraqi Jews. In 1968, there were only about 2,000 Jews still living there. On January 27, 1969, nine Jews were hanged on charges of spying for Israel, causing most of the remaining community to flee the country. In 2020 only 4 Jews were still alive in Iraq. In March 2021 only 3.

== See also ==
- Operation Magic Carpet
- Operation Yachin
- Iraqi Jews in Israel
- Iraqi Jewish Archive
