= Abbas Shiblak =

Palestinian academic

Abbas Shiblak (born 6 January 1944) is a Palestinian academic, historian, Research Associate at the Refugee Studies Centre (RSC), University of Oxford (a post he has held since 1992), free-lance writer, former diplomat and an advocate of human rights.

Shiblak specialises in refugee-host country relationships and international humanitarian law. For a few years, he has been working on a paper on the topic of statelessness in the Arab region.

Shiblak founded Shaml, the Palestinian Refugee and Diaspora Centre in Ramallah, and also served as its first director. Shiblak was also a member of the Palestinian delegation to the peace talks on the "Working Group on Refugees".

== Personal life ==
Shiblak was born in British Mandate Palestine and, after completing his schooling in Jordan, his university education in Egypt, and working in Lebanon, he moved to Britain in 1975, where he completed his postgraduate education in international relations. Shiblak then pursued a career in free-lance journalism, diplomacy, and developed an interest in refugee affairs and stateless communities, with particular reference to the Middle East. Shiblak resides in the United Kingdom.

== Publications ==
Among his publications:

- The Palestinian diaspora in Europe; Challenge of Adaptation and Identity (ed), Shaml & IJS, Jerusalem, 2005.
- A new edition of his book on the Exodus of the Iraqi Jewish community 1949-1951, Saqi Books, London 2005.
- Iraqi Jews: A History
- The Lure of Zion: The Case of the Iraqi Jews
- Residency status and civil rights of Palestinian refugees in Arab countries
- Palestinians in Lebanon and the PLO
- Statelessness among Palestinian Refugees
