= Shafiq Ades =

Syrian Jewish businessman

- شفيق عدس שפיק עדס
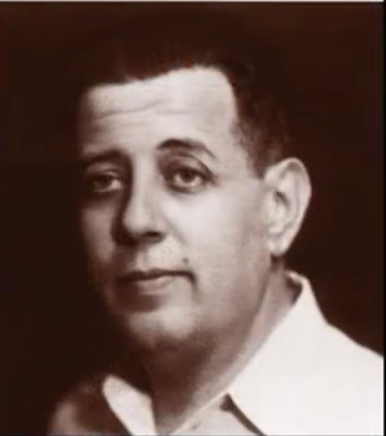
- Born: 1900; Aleppo, Syria
- Died: 23 September 1948 (aged 47–48); Basra, Iraq
- Cause of death: Execution by hanging
- Occupation: Businessman
- Criminal charge: Affiliation with Israel and the Iraqi Communist Party (unproven)

Shafiq Ades (Arabic: شفيق عدس, Hebrew: שפיק עדס; 1900 – 23 September 1948) was a Syrian-born Iraqi-Jewish businessman. He was widely known as the wealthiest and best-connected Jew in the country. Based in Basra, he had all of his assets confiscated by the Iraqi government and was subsequently sentenced to death during a rushed show trial, which alleged that he was a Zionist and a communist; it had become a criminal offense in Iraq and the other Arab countries for both Jews and non-Jews to be affiliated with Israel in any way following the 1948 Arab–Israeli War. More specifically, Ades was tried on charges of supplying weapons to Israel and of supporting the Iraqi Communist Party, though neither of these claims was backed up with any evidence in court and Ades was not given the right to a proper defense. Four months after the Israeli Declaration of Independence, he was executed by hanging at his residence in front of a crowd of over 12,000 people. His execution was among the events that contributed to the Jewish exodus from Iraq.

== Early life and career ==
Ades was born to a wealthy family based in Aleppo, Syria. He migrated to Iraq and based himself in Basra.

His main business activity was the establishment and management of the Ford Motor Company agency in Iraq. He further partnered with a Muslim named Naji Al-Khedhairi in purchasing military metal scrap left in Iraq by the British army, selling the unusable parts after usable parts were sold to the government of Iraq. Involved with the Ford concession in the country, Ades accumulated business and personal ties with high-profile Iraqi notables and officials and even had accessibility to the regent, 'Abd al-Ilah. Martin Gilbert writes that Ades “had lunched with Government ministers and dined with the Regent.” The Ford importer was by 1948 the wealthiest Jew in Iraq. He was described by historians as a “political pragmatist” with “no time for ideologues of any stripe, least of all Zionists.”

== Trial and death ==
=== Trial and conviction ===
In July 1948, Iraq made Zionist affiliation a criminal offense. When arrested, Ades was “accused simultaneously of being a Zionist and a Communist. For the main charge against him, that he had sold arms to Israel, the military court presented no evidence. He was also refused the right to a proper defense.

In a military tribunal, accused of sending cars to Israel, Ades was charged with donating money to the Iraqi Communist Party and with supporting the military efforts of Israel. He was sentenced to death and ordered to pay a fine of 5 million Dinars. The rest of his property was confiscated. Scholars Moshe Gat and Philip Mendes reached the conclusion that Ades was innocent. They cite the following evidence:

- No such complaints were ever filed against his Muslim partner or many other scrap traders.
- The trial lasted only 3 days and the defendant was not allowed to plead his case.
- No witnesses were called.
- The show trial was presided over by Judge Abdullah al-Naasni, a member of the anti-Jewish, pro-Nazi Istiqlal Party.
- No concrete evidence was presented that the arms were shipped from Italy to Israel.

His execution was set to take place several days after he was found guilty. Although hundreds of Jewish individuals were detained that summer, Ades was the only one who received a death sentence. The only Jew in his organization, he was also the only member of his business to be punished for the crime the business was convicted of.

=== Execution ===
Following the show trial, Ades was hanged in front of his newly completed mansion in Basra on September 23, 1948. 12,000 onlookers came from all parts of Iraq to witness the hanging of the so-called "traitor." Authorities left his dead body in the square for hours and it was abused by the celebrating crowds. Mona Yahya, who had family living in Iraq at the time, later wrote about the hanging that “crowds gathered to watch the spectacle and their cheers incited the hangman to a repeat performance. The next day, close-up shots of the hanged man covered the front pages of the Iraqi newspapers. His neck was broken, his corpse dangled over his puddle of excrement. He was labelled the Serpent, the Traitor, the Spy, the Zionist, the Jew, while his estate worth millions was appropriated by the Ministry of Defense."

=== Aftermath ===
With one historian calling it the "greatest shock to the Jewish community [of Iraq]," the execution of Ades came as a profound shock to the Jewish community. As he was an assimilated and non-Zionist Jew, the affair significantly reduced support for assimilation into Iraqi society and increased support for emigration as a solution to the crisis in the Iraqi Jewish community. The Jewish community general sentiment was that if a man as well connected and powerful as Shafiq Ades could be eliminated by the state, other Jews would not be protected any longer. The Israeli National Archives has written that after Ades’ September 1948 hanging under false accusations, as well as other legal repressions such as travel bans, “the persecutions caused many Jews to secretly cross the border to Iran and from there escape to Israel.”

By October following his execution, all Jews were dismissed from their government positions in the Iraqi government, totaling around 1,500 people.

The assets confiscated from the Egyptian branch of his family were valued at over 1.4 million Egyptian pounds. Most of the assets confiscated were through David Ades & Son, which operated in Cairo and Alexandria. The family's private property was also confiscated by the Iraqi government. As of 2001, a children's store with the Ades name continued to operate in Cairo, under ownership of the Iraqi government.

== Legacy ==
There are streets in the Israeli cities of Ramle, Petah Tikva and Herzliya that are named after Ades.

== See also ==
- Farhud
- History of the Jews in Iraq
- Jewish exodus from Arab lands
- Antisemitism in the Arab world
- Islam and Antisemitism
- 1950-1951 Baghdad bombings
