= Yehuda Benasouli =

Spanish rabbi (1933–2010)

Yehuda Benasouli

Rabbi Yehuda Benasouli (Hebrew: יהודה בנאסולי; 1933 – 31 May 2010) was a Moroccan-born Orthodox Jewish rabbi. Benasouli served as the Chief Rabbi of Madrid from 1978 until 1997.

== Early life and education ==
Benasouli was born in 1933 into a Sephardic Jewish family in Alcazarquivir (Ksar el-Kebir) in what was then Spanish Morocco.

Benasouli's father died when he was young, and Benasouli's uncle Rabbi Yaakov Sebag took responsibility for him. He enrolled in a yeshiva in Meknes to study under Rabbi Raphael Baruch Toledano, a scion of the prominent Sephardic Toledano family. At the age of 18, Benasouli was ordained by Toledano.

In the 3 years after the establishment of the State of Israel in 1948, more than 28,000 Jews immigrated from Morocco to Israel, including Rabbi Sebag. Benasouli, still in his 20s, became the rabbi of his hometown of Alcazarquivir. In the early 1960s, Benasouli's bailiwick grew to include Larache and Souk El Arbaa.

Benasouli's first language was Castilian Spanish, and he also knew Hebrew, French, Arabic, Ladino, Haketia, and some English.

== Life in Spain ==
Benasouli arrived in Madrid in 1968, as part of massive Jewish emigration from Morocco after Israel's victory in the Six-Day War in 1967. When Benasouli arrived, the Madrid community was home to approximately 2,500 Jews, having grown from 300 in 1959. Benasouli served as a mohel (circumciser), shochet (ritual slaughterer), and mashgiach (kosher supervisor) in the community. In 1978, he became the community's chief rabbi, succeeding Benito Gershon, who was also from Spanish Morocco.

In 1992, Benasouli hosted King of Spain Juan Carlos I and Queen Sofia at the Beth Yaacov Synagogue to commemorate the 500th anniversary of the Alhambra Decree. The occasion marked the first time that the king had visited a synagogue in Spain.

In 1997, Moroccan-born Moshe Bendahan succeeded Benasouli as Chief Rabbi of Madrid.

== Death ==
Benasouli died on 31 May 2010. He is buried in the Ponevezh cemetery in Bnei Brak, Israel, near his mentor Toledano.

== See also ==
- Federation of Jewish Communities of Spain
- Samuel Toledano
