= Museum of Moroccan Judaism =

Museum of Moroccan Judaism in Casablanca

Coordinates: 33.5557°N 7.6424°W

- متحف اليهودية المغربية מוזיאון יהדות מרוקו
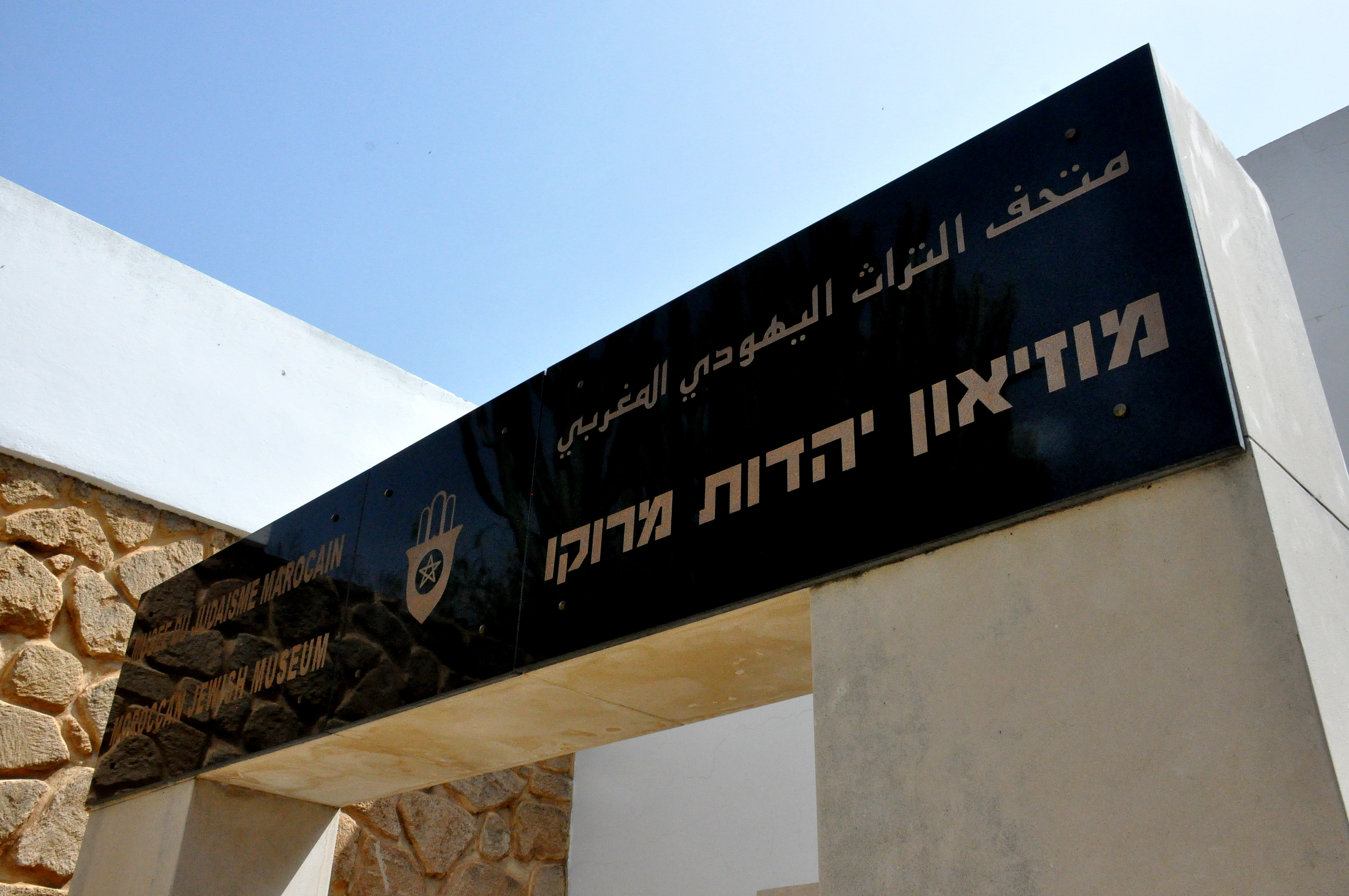
- Museum of Moroccan Judaism, Casablanca, Morocco
- Established: 1997
- Founder: Simon Levy
- Curator: Zhor Rehihil
- Website: www.jewishmuseumcasa.com

The Museum of Moroccan Judaism (Arabic: متحف اليهودية المغربية, Hebrew: מוזיאון יהדות מרוקו) is a museum of Jewish life in Morocco in Casablanca, Morocco.

Established in 1997, it became the first museum devoted to Judaism in the Arab world. The museum, whose building originated in 1948 as a Jewish orphanage that housed up to 160 Jewish youth, was opened by King Mohammed VI of Morocco on 20 December 2016. Its collection includes paintings, photographs, sculptures, ritual objects, costumes, jewellery, and reconstructions of Moroccan synagogues.

== History ==
Moroccan Jews constitute an ancient community. Before the founding of the state of Israel in 1948, there were about 250,000 to 350,000 Jews in the country, which made Morocco the largest Jewish community in the Muslim world, but fewer than 2,500 remain today.

The museum was initiated by Jewish Moroccans Serge Berdugo, Jacques Toledano, Boris Toledano and Simon Levy (1934 – 2011). Levy, a former professor at the University of Rabat, was also the administrator of the Foundation of Jewish Cultural Heritage. Prior to his role in preserving Moroccan Jewish culture, he was known as an activist for national independence and human rights from the time of the French protectorate in Morocco and the reign of King Hassan II.

After its restoration, the building was rededicated as museum by King Mohammed VI of Morocco on December 20, 2016. In addition to the king and Moroccan government officials, the opening was attended by the museum's president, Jacques Toledano and Samuel L. Kaplan, US ambassador to Morocco.

On 12 October 2026, the government-sponsored Museum of Moroccan Jewish Culture in Fez was opened for the public. The ceremony was attended by the Minister of Islamic Affairs, Ahmed Toufiq and the president of the Fondation du Patrimoine Culturel judéo-Marocain, Serge Berdugo, among others.

== Exhibits ==
The building, situated in the Oasis neighborhood of Casablanca, covers 700 square metres and consists of a large multipurpose room and three exhibition rooms. Exhibits include paintings, photographs, and sculptures of Jewish life in Morocco. The exhibition rooms contain ritual objects, historic documents, costumes and jewellery from religious and family life, in addition to reconstructions of Moroccan synagogues.

Further, visitors can find artifacts of Moroccan Jewish life, including the bimah (c. 1944) from the Beni-Issakhar Synagogue in Casablanca, Torah scrolls, mezuzahs and a Hanukkah menorah. The museum also touts a collection of Jewish Berber history, including costumes, jewellery khmisa pendants. Visitors can also observe a reconstructed jewelry-making workshop, which was created using the workbench and tools of Jewish silversmith Saul Cohen.

A historic Moroccan document about the persecution of Jews in North Africa by Nazi Germany and the Vichy regime, commemorating the defeat of the Axis powers in Africa, is the so-called Megilat Hitler. This document was written by Asher Ḥassin, a Moroccan Jew and Hebrew teacher, who lived through the horrors of the Vichy regime and wrote this scroll in the style of the biblical Book of Esther.

In January 2019, French-Moroccan opera singer David Serero donated a large part of his Moroccan Judaica art collection, the largest donation of Judaica artifacts donated to a Moroccan museum.

One of the most notable items is the preamble of Morocco's updated 2011 constitution, which cites Hebraic influences as a pillar of national unity. Museum director, Zhor Rehihil, was quoted declaring that, “the new constitution emphasizes both ethnic and religious pluralism in Morocco.”

=== Pictures of the museum collection ===
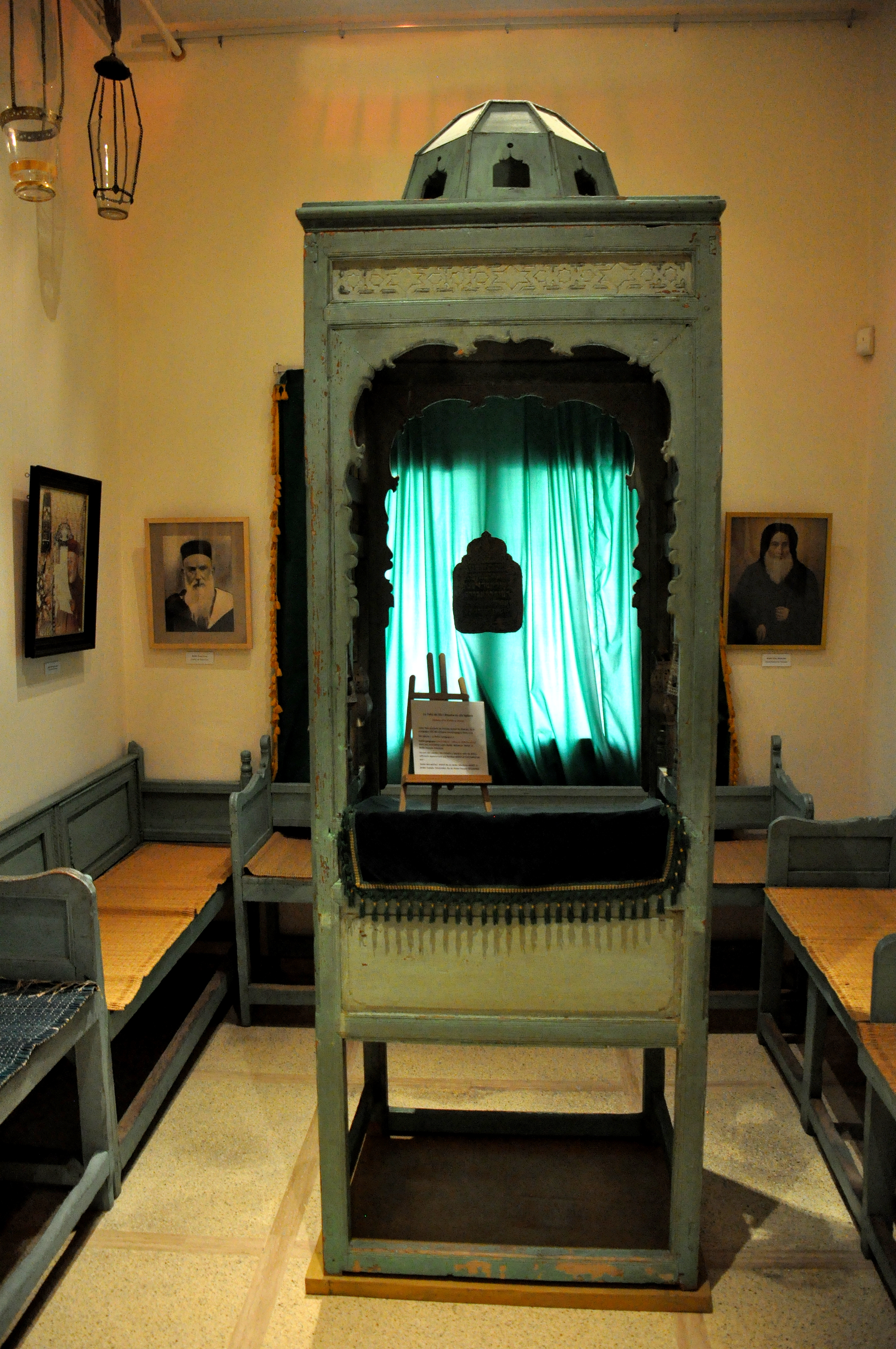
One of the halls of the Moroccan Jewish Museum, Casablanca

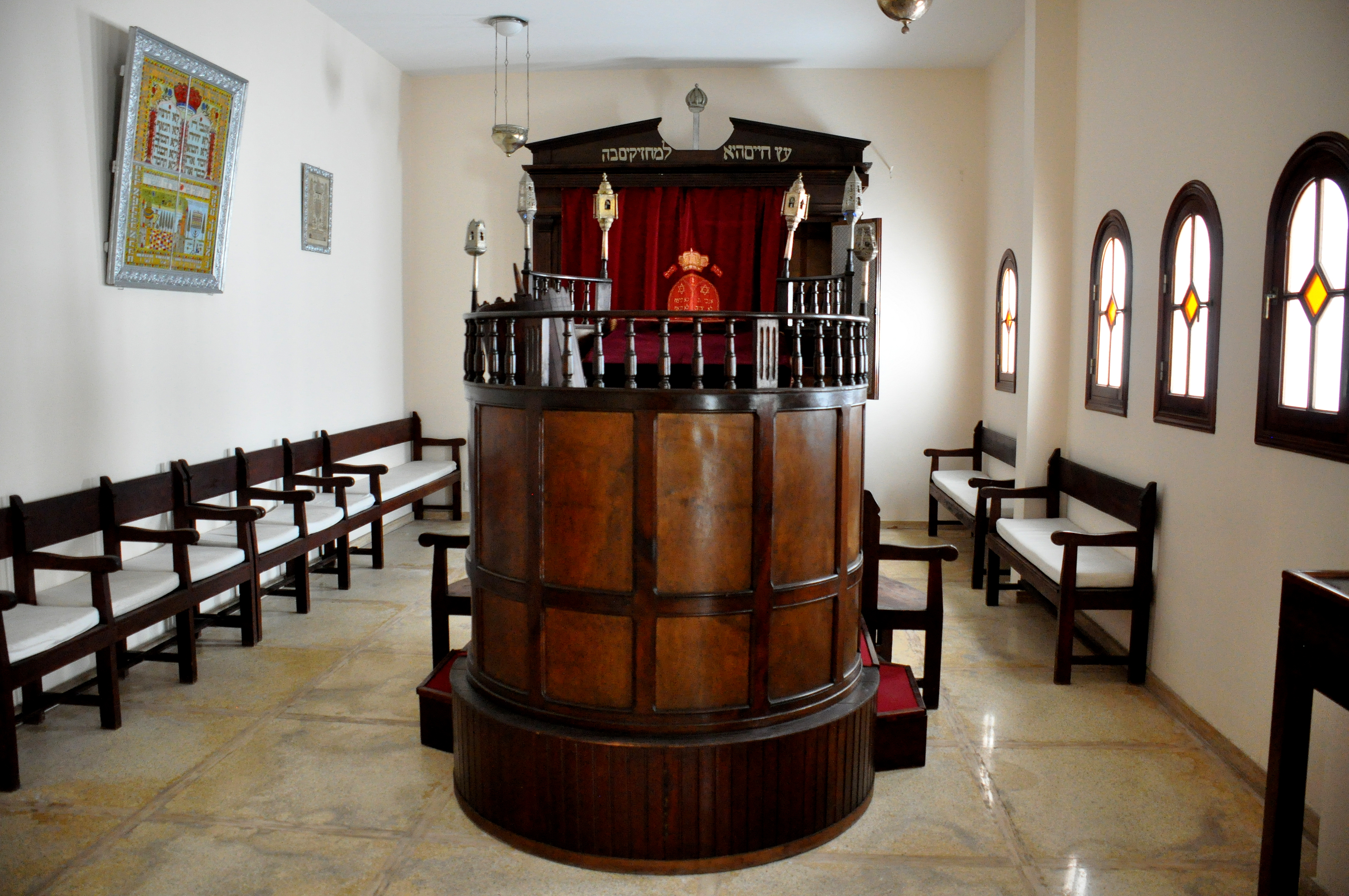
One of the halls of the Moroccan Jewish Museum, Casablanca

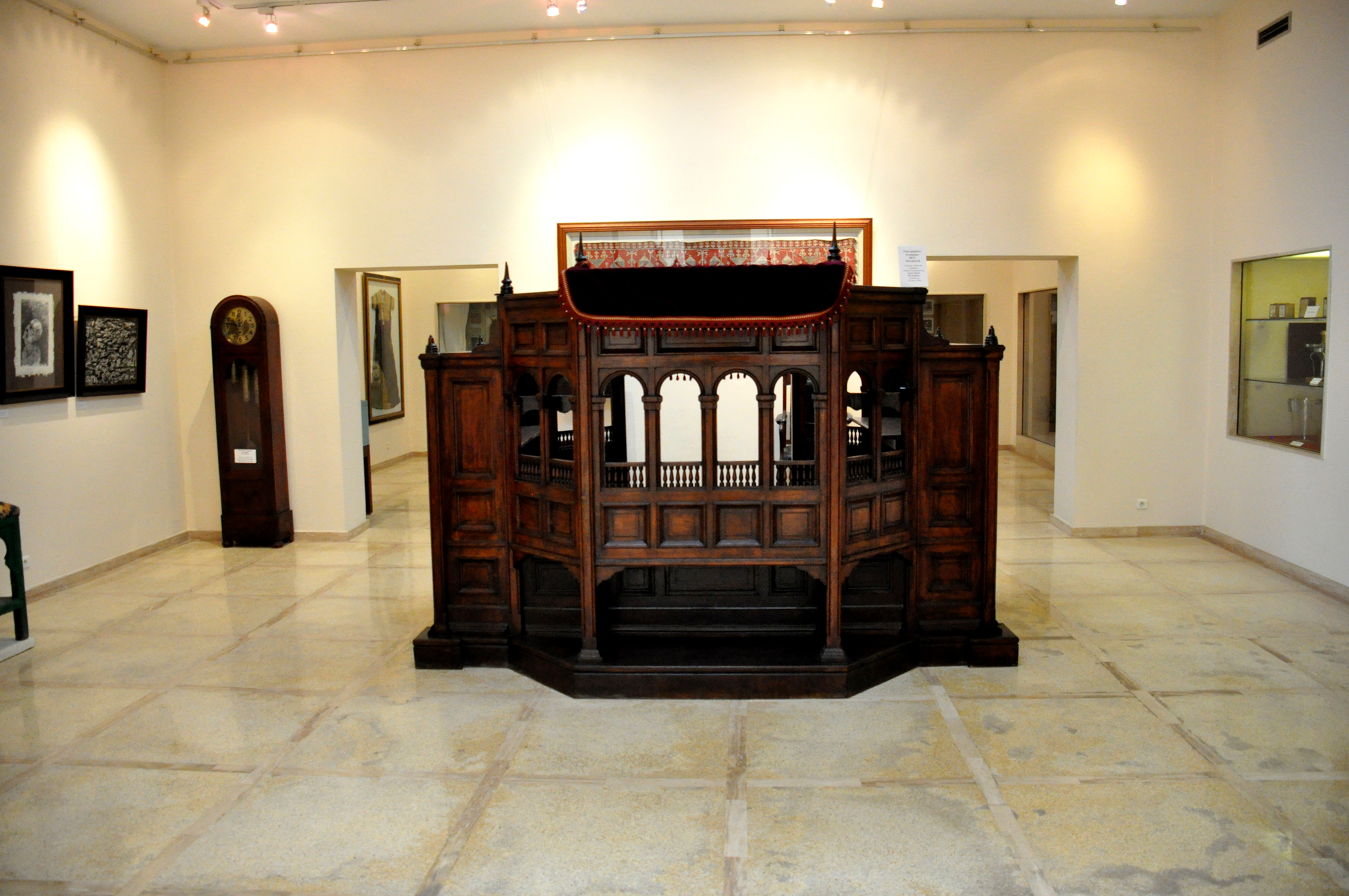
One of the halls of the Moroccan Jewish Museum, Casablanca

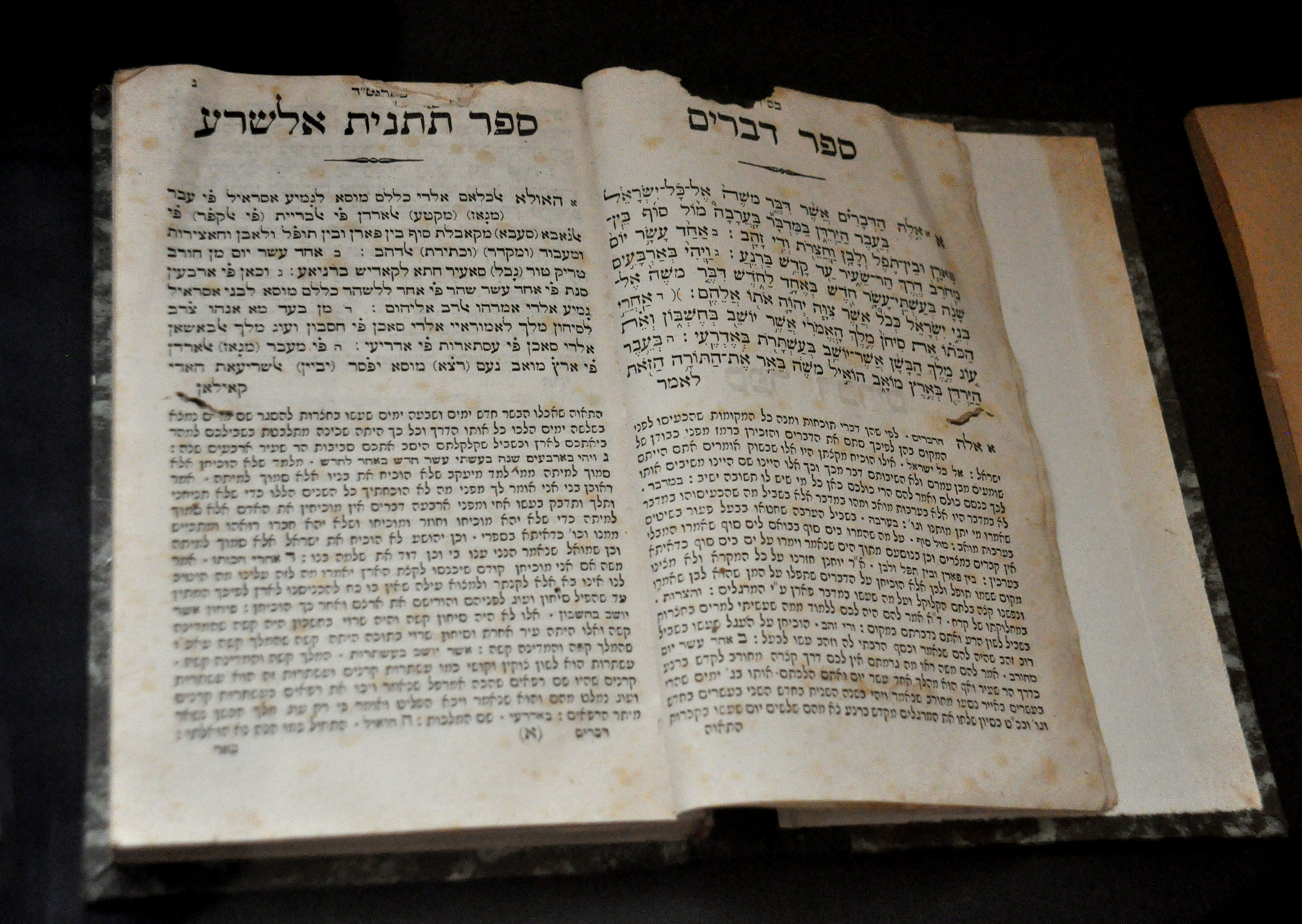
The Book of Deuteronomy, Debarim. Hebrew with translation in Judeo-Arabic, transcribed in Hebrew letters, 1894 CE

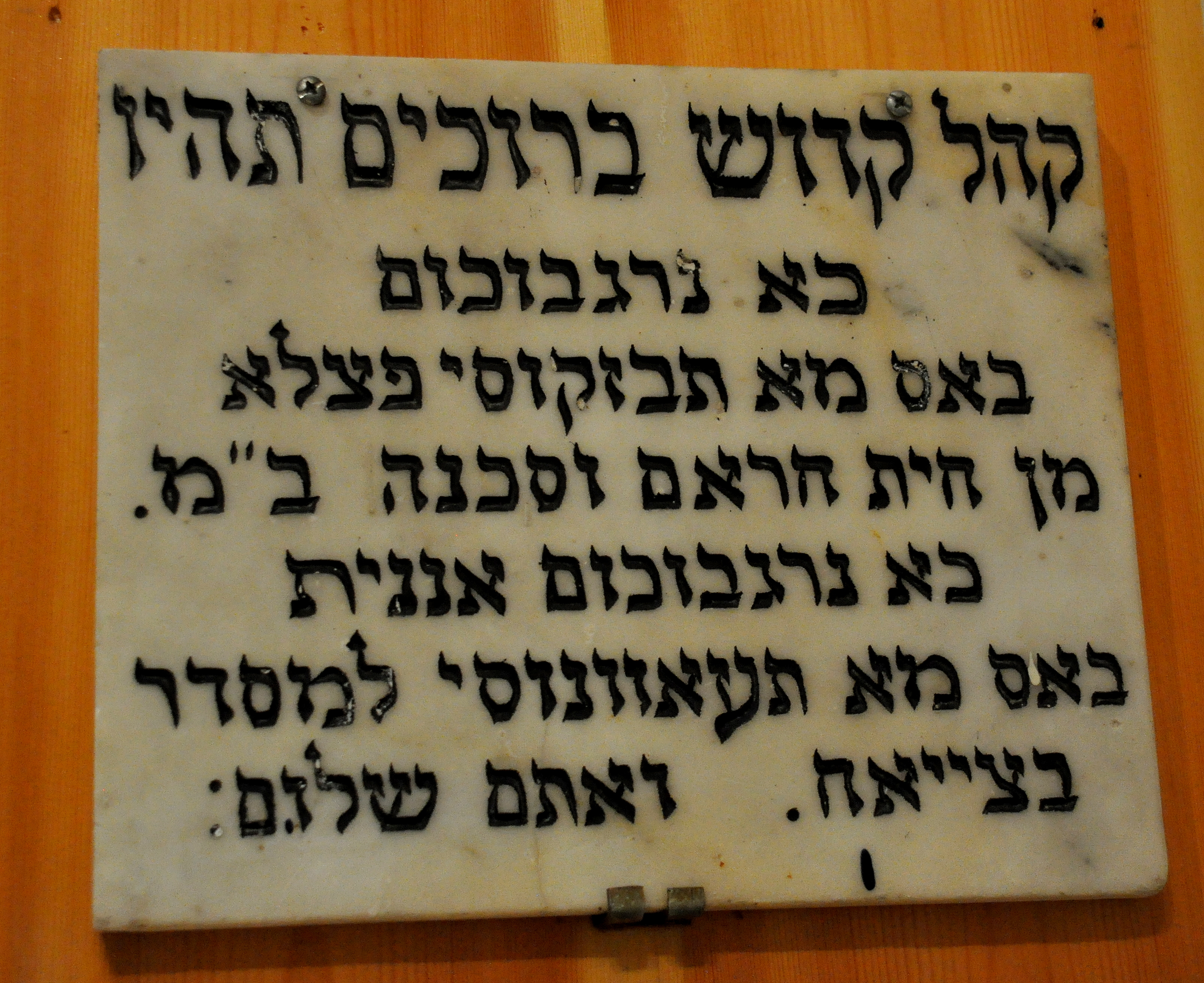
A wall sign advising attendants of a Jewish synagogue on what to do during prayer.

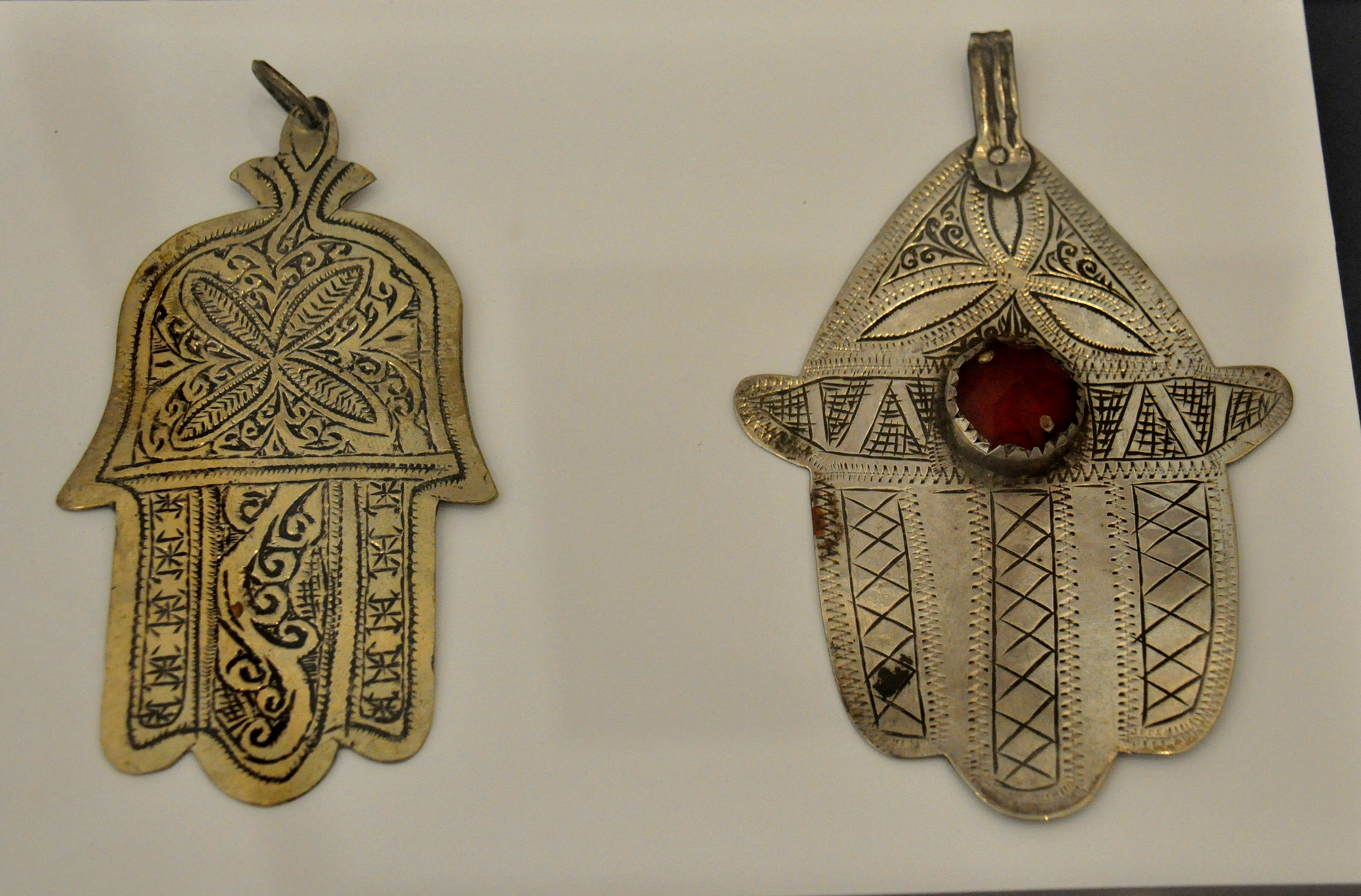
Khmisa amulets, once belonging to a Jewish family

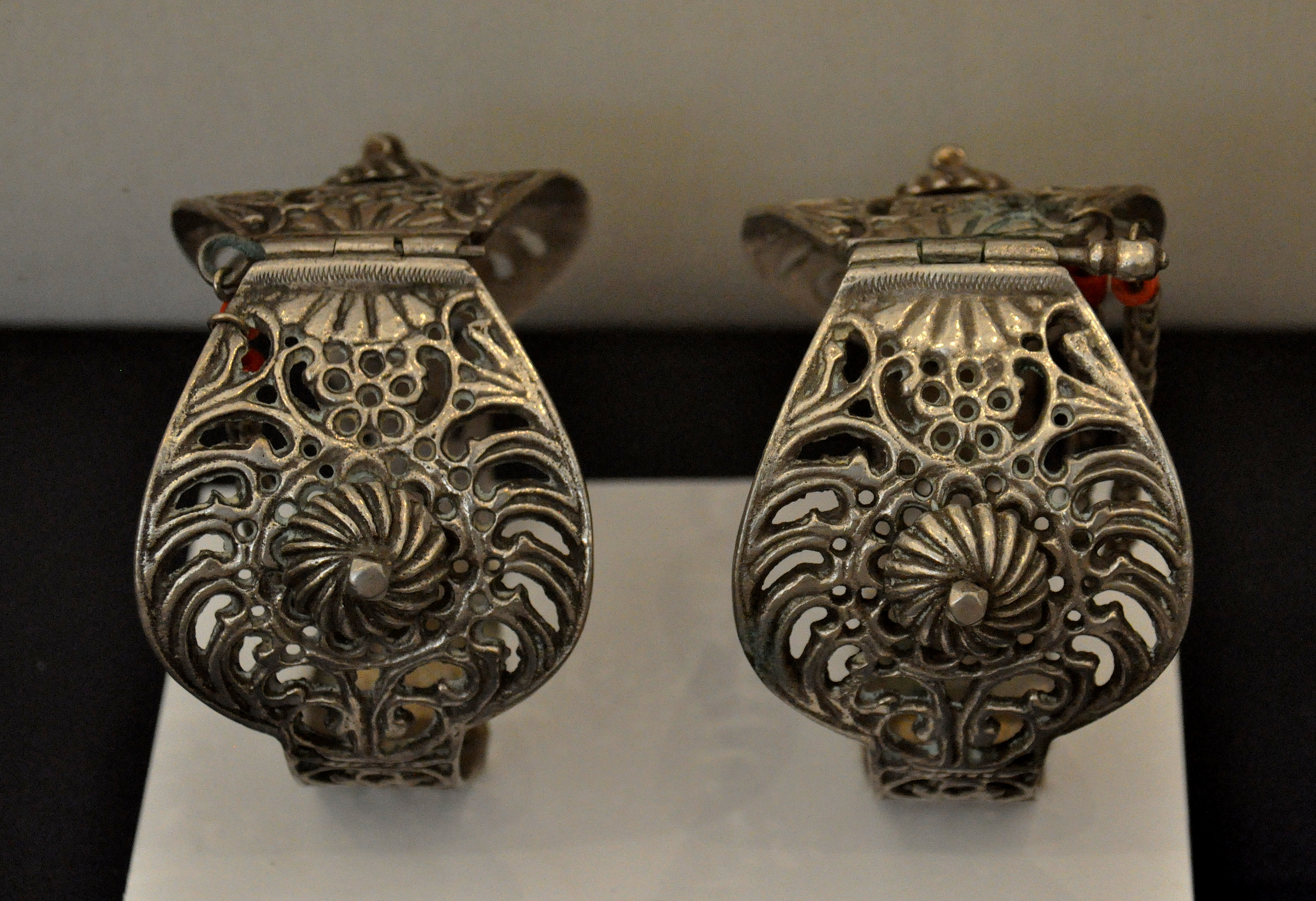
Pair of silver anklets, once belonging to a Jewish woman

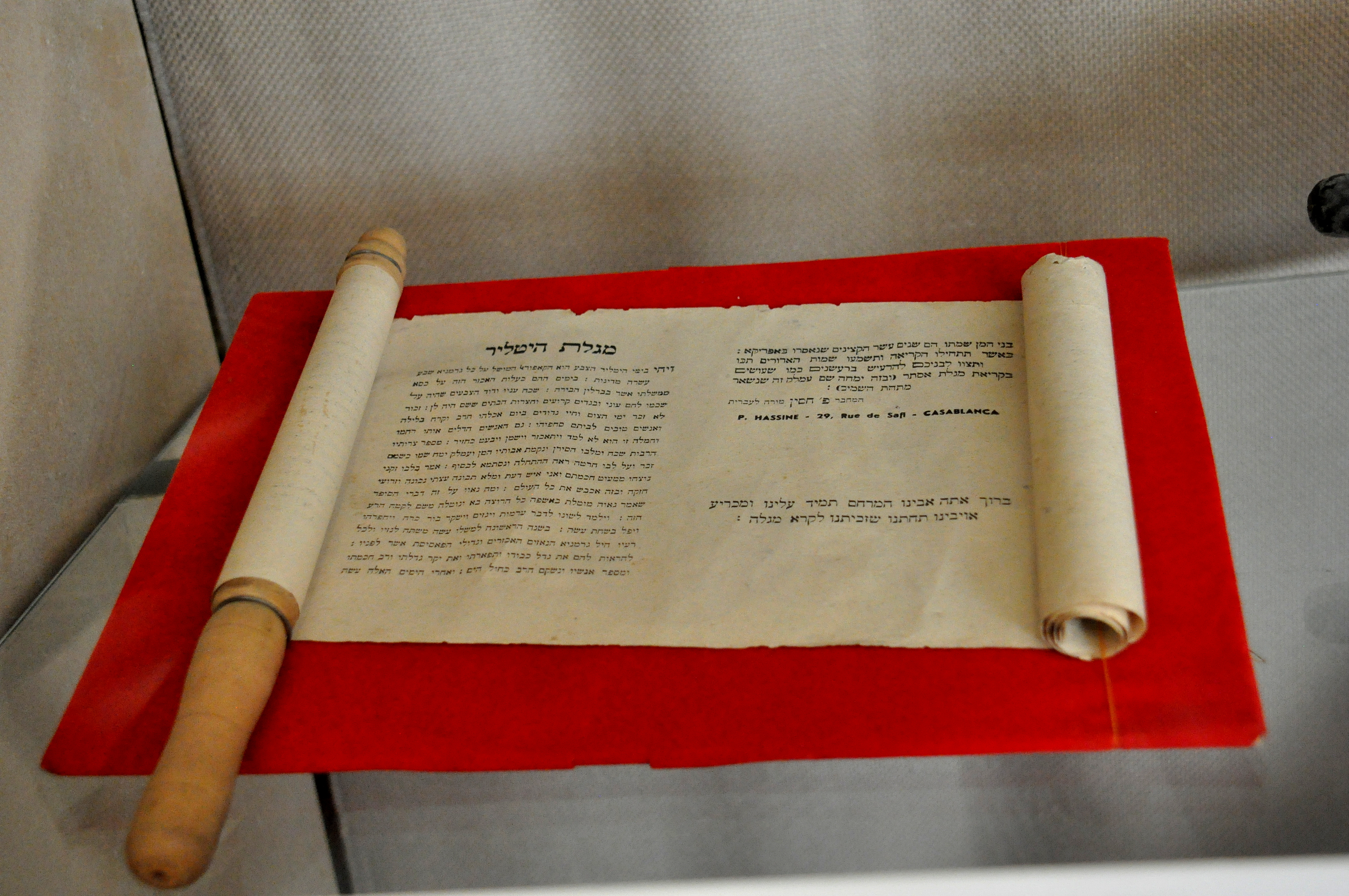
Megillah, so-called Megillat-Hitler

== See also ==
- History of the Jews in Morocco
- Maghrebi Jews
- List of Moroccan Jews
