= Toledo =

Toledo most commonly refers to:

- Toledo, Spain, a city in Spain
- Province of Toledo, Spain
- Toledo, Ohio, a city in the United States

Toledo may also refer to:

== Places ==
=== Belize ===
- Toledo District
- Toledo Settlement

=== Bolivia ===
- Toledo, Oruro

=== Brazil ===
- Toledo, Minas Gerais
- Toledo, Paraná

=== Canada ===
- Toledo, Ontario, a city in Canada

=== Colombia ===
- Toledo, Norte de Santander
- Toledo, Antioquia

=== Philippines ===
- Toledo, Cebu

=== Spain ===
- Taifa of Toledo (1010–1085)
- Kingdom of Toledo (Crown of Castile) (1085–1833)
- Province of Toledo, Spain
- Roman Catholic Archdiocese of Toledo
- Toledo (Congress of Deputies constituency)

=== United States ===
- Toledo, Georgia, an unincorporated community
- Toledo, Illinois, a village
- Toledo, Iowa, a city
- Toledo, Kansas, an unincorporated community
- Toledo, Callaway County, Missouri, an unincorporated community
- Toledo, Ozark County, Missouri, an unincorporated community
- Toledo, Ohio, a city
- Toledo, Oregon, a city
- Toledo, Washington, a city
- Toledo, Texas, an unincorporated community in Fayette County, Texas
- Toledo Township, Tama County, Iowa
- Toledo Township, Chase County, Kansas

=== Uruguay ===
- Toledo, Uruguay

== Ships ==
- USS Toledo (PF-33), a patrol frigate that was renamed USS Dearborn in 1943
- USS Toledo (CA-133), a Baltimore-class heavy cruiser of the United States Navy active during the Korean War
- USS Toledo (SSN-769), a Los Angeles-class submarine commissioned in 1995

== Other uses ==
- Toledo (surname), a surname (including a list of people with the name)
- University of Toledo, a university in Ohio
  - Toledo Rockets, the university's athletics teams
- Mettler Toledo or Toledo Scale Company
- SEAT Toledo, a compact automobile by Spanish automaker SEAT
- Toledo (air defense system), an air defense system consisting of Skyguard components including Aspide launchers, but with a Skydor fire control unit from Navantia
- Toledo steel, a material used in making blades
- Triumph Toledo, a (defunct) compact automobile by British Leyland
- Toledo (Naples Metro), a station on Line 1 of the Naples Metro
- Toledo Progressive Party, a political party in Belize
- Toledo (band), an American indie rock band

== See also ==
- Pedro de Toledo, São Paulo
- Toledano
- Toledo Chico, a neighborhood in Montevideo
- Toledo Strip, an Ohio/Michigan border region, disputed in the 1830s Toledo War
