= Beth Yaacov Synagogue (Madrid) =

Synagogue in Madrid, Spain

- Spanish: Sinagoga Beth Yaacov
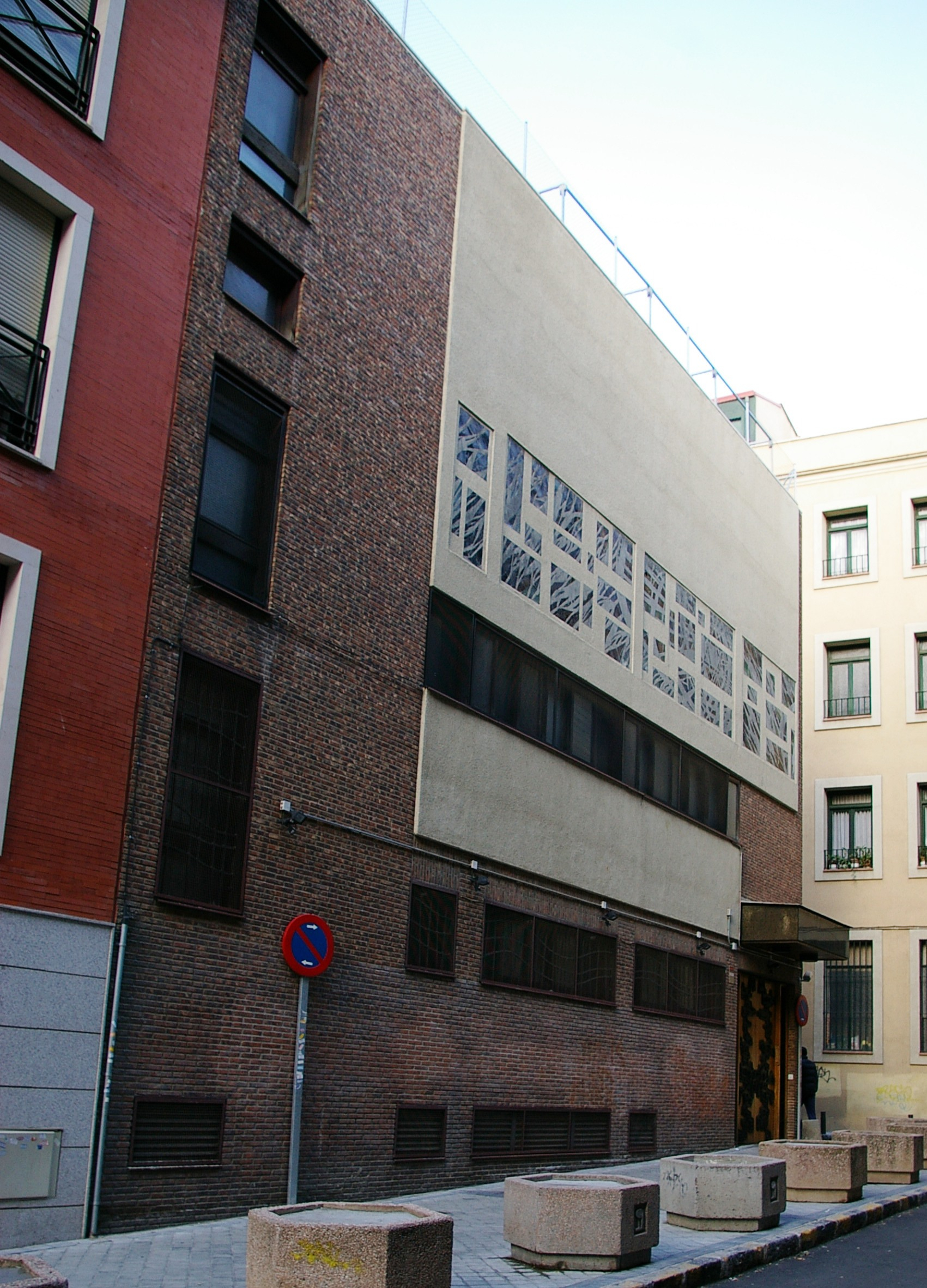
- The Jewish Community of Madrid (CJM) building, in 2006, which houses the synagogue

- Location of the synagogue in Madrid

Religion
- Affiliation: Judaism
- Rite: Nusach Sefard
- Ecclesiastical or organisational status: Synagogue
- Ownership: Jewish Community of Madrid
- Status: Active

Location
- Location: 3 Calle Balmes, Chamberí, Madrid
- Country: Spain
- Coordinates: 40°26′07″N 03°42′00″W

Architecture
- Type: Synagogue architecture
- Style: Modernist
- Established: 1917 (as a congregation)
- Groundbreaking: 1964
- Completed: 1968
- Materials: Brick

Website
- cjmadrid.org

The Beth Yaacov Synagogue (Spanish: Sinagoga Beth Yaacov), also known as the Beth Jacob Synagogue or the Synagogue of Madrid, is a Jewish congregation and synagogue, located at 3 Calle Balmes, in the Chamberí district of Madrid, Spain. When it opened in 1968, it was the first new synagogue building built in Spain since the Catholic Monarchs of Spain expelled the country's Jews in 1492.

== History ==
=== Early developments ===
Jewish life in Spain's major cities existed in the later decades of the 19th century, but only coalesced into organized bodies around the time of World War I. The Jewish Community of Madrid (CJM) was formally established in 1917. The CJM prayed at the Midras Abordonel synagogue on Calle Príncipe. It was the first Jewish house of worship in Spain since 1492, but was not a new building.

However, after the victory of Francisco Franco in the Spanish Civil War in 1939, the Spanish right-wing moved against so-called "enemy elements" purportedly working in the interests of Bolsheviks and a "Judeo-Masonic conspiracy". The government subsequently shut down the synagogue in Madrid.

In 1949, the community moved to the Lawenda Oratory. A decade later, the Community moved to Calle de Pizarro.

By the late 1960s, the Jewish community in Madrid had grown rapidly for several reasons. Spain's 1967 Law on Religious Freedom granted full public religious rights to non-Catholics, including Jews. In addition, Israel’s victory over the coalition of Arab states in the Six-Day War in 1967 pushed a large population of Jews in Morocco to emigrate to Spain. This included future Chief Rabbi of Madrid Yehuda Benasouli.

=== Construction ===
In 1959, the Jewish community in Madrid received permission to open an official synagogue. The community previously had operated out of a private home. In 1964, the Jewish community in Spain was officially legalized as a political entity as part of Franco's "25 years of peace" celebration. That year, the Jewish communities in Madrid and Barcelona created the Israelite Communal Council, and construction of a new synagogue building in Madrid began.

The rectangular building, designed by a Spanish architect, included a main sanctuary with seating for 550 people and space for education, social, and community activities. The total cost of $250,000 was covered by funds raised by the local community and $150,000 from the American Jewish Joint Distribution Committee and the Conference on Jewish Material Claims Against Germany.

The sanctuary is decorated with the Hebrew inscriptions modeled after the Synagogue of El Transito in Toledo.

=== Early history ===
On December 16, 1968, the Beth Yaacov synagogue opened on Balmes Street in the Chamberí district of Madrid, at a ceremony attended by 600 locals and Jewish dignitaries from across the world. It was the first new synagogue built in Spain since 1492. The synagogue's first rabbi was Benito Garson, who had immigrated to Madrid from Tetuan, Spanish Morocco, and had earned his rabbinic ordination in London. On the same day as the opening, the Spanish Ministry of Justice officially repealed the Alhambra Decree of 1492 that expelled practicing Jews from Spain. A letter announcing the repeal was presented to Samuel Toledano, leader of the Federation of Jewish Communities of Spain, and read from the pulpit of Beth Yaacov synagogue, which would serve the city's 2,500 Jews. Notably, the repeal ended the requirement that Jews obtain official permission from the Spanish government to hold religious services.

In 1972, the synagogue was vandalized by right-wing extremists associated with far-right paramilitary organization Warriors of Christ the King.

Queen Sofia attended Shabbat services at the synagogue in June 1976, marking the first time in modern Spanish history that a member of the royal family had visited a Jewish house of worship. In addition, the visit was Sofia's first public appearance since her husband King of Spain Juan Carlos I assumed the throne.

=== 1990-present ===
King Juan Carlos I and Queen Sofia visited the synagogue on March 31, 1992, to commemorate the 500th anniversary of the Alhambra Decree. The king wore a white yarmulke and prayed for peace with approximately 250 people in an 85-minute ceremony, in what the Los Angeles Times called "a remarkable gesture of reconciliation."

While Queen Sofia had previously visited the synagogue, the event was the first visit by a Spanish king to a Jewish house of worship in the modern era. The Spanish royals were joined by Israeli President Chaim Herzog, Herzog's predecessor Yitzhak Navon, Rabbi Solomon Gaon and other Israeli and Spanish officials. Also present were descendants of Abraham Senior and Isaac Abarbanel, who had unsuccessfully petitioned King Ferdinand and Queen Isabella to retract the edict.

Since 1997, Moshe Bendahan has been the mara d’atra of the Beth Yaacov synagogue, as the Chief Rabbi of Madrid. Bendahan's family fled Morocco in 1964, and he began his rabbinic service in Spain in 1986, the same year that Spain and Israel formally established diplomatic relations.

The Beth Yaacov Synagogue functions as the Jewish community of Madrid's (CJM) main Orthodox synagogue. The building houses the CJM's offices, rabbinate, a mikveh, and a history museum.

As of 2012, the Beit Yaacov synagogue was one of seven synagogues serving the approximately 20,000-strong Jewish community in Madrid.

In 2021, the Spanish National Police arrested a 68-year-old man for graffitiing a Nazi swastika on one of the protective bollards outside the synagogue.

== Gallery ==
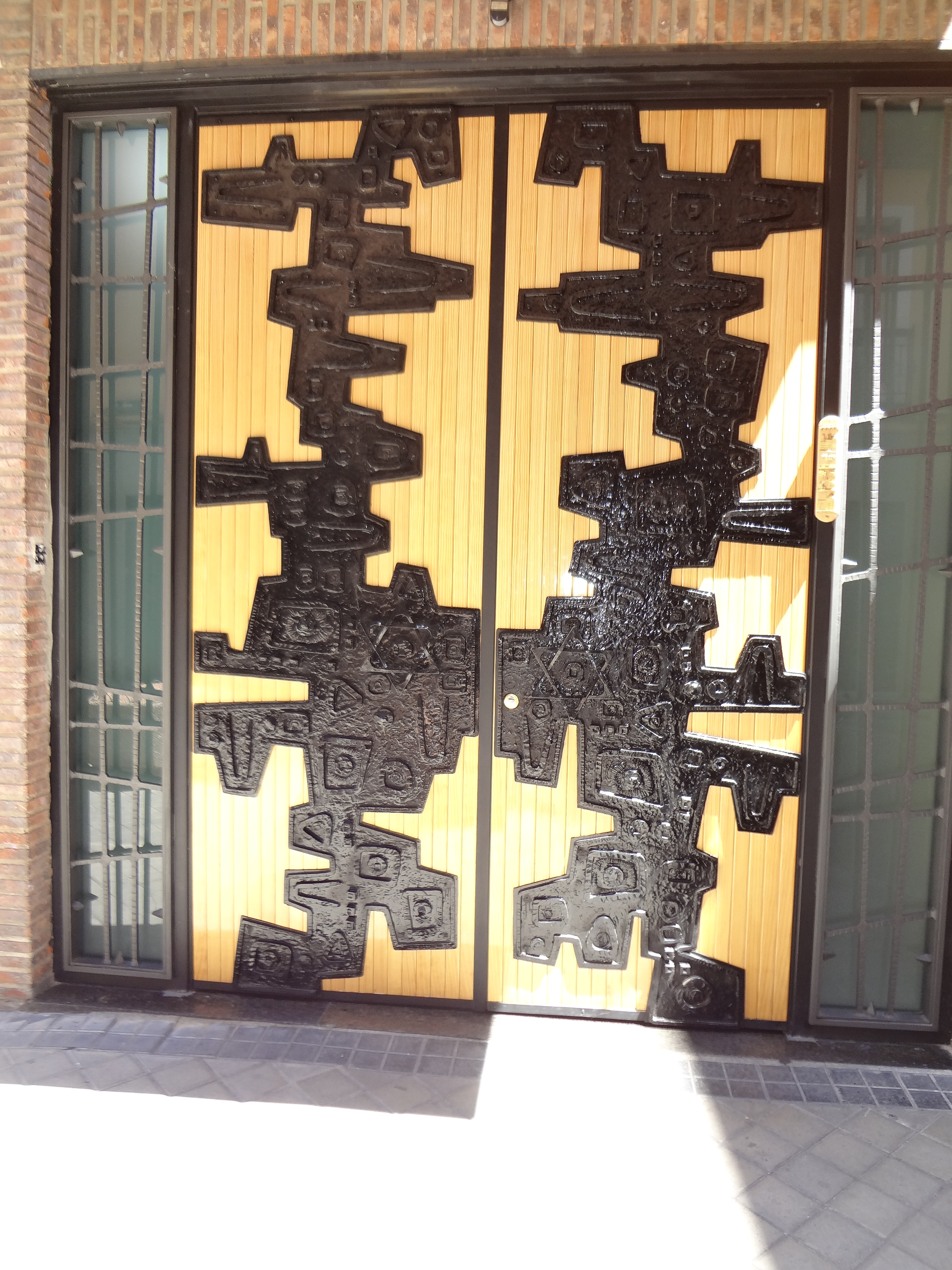
The synagogue's entrance door

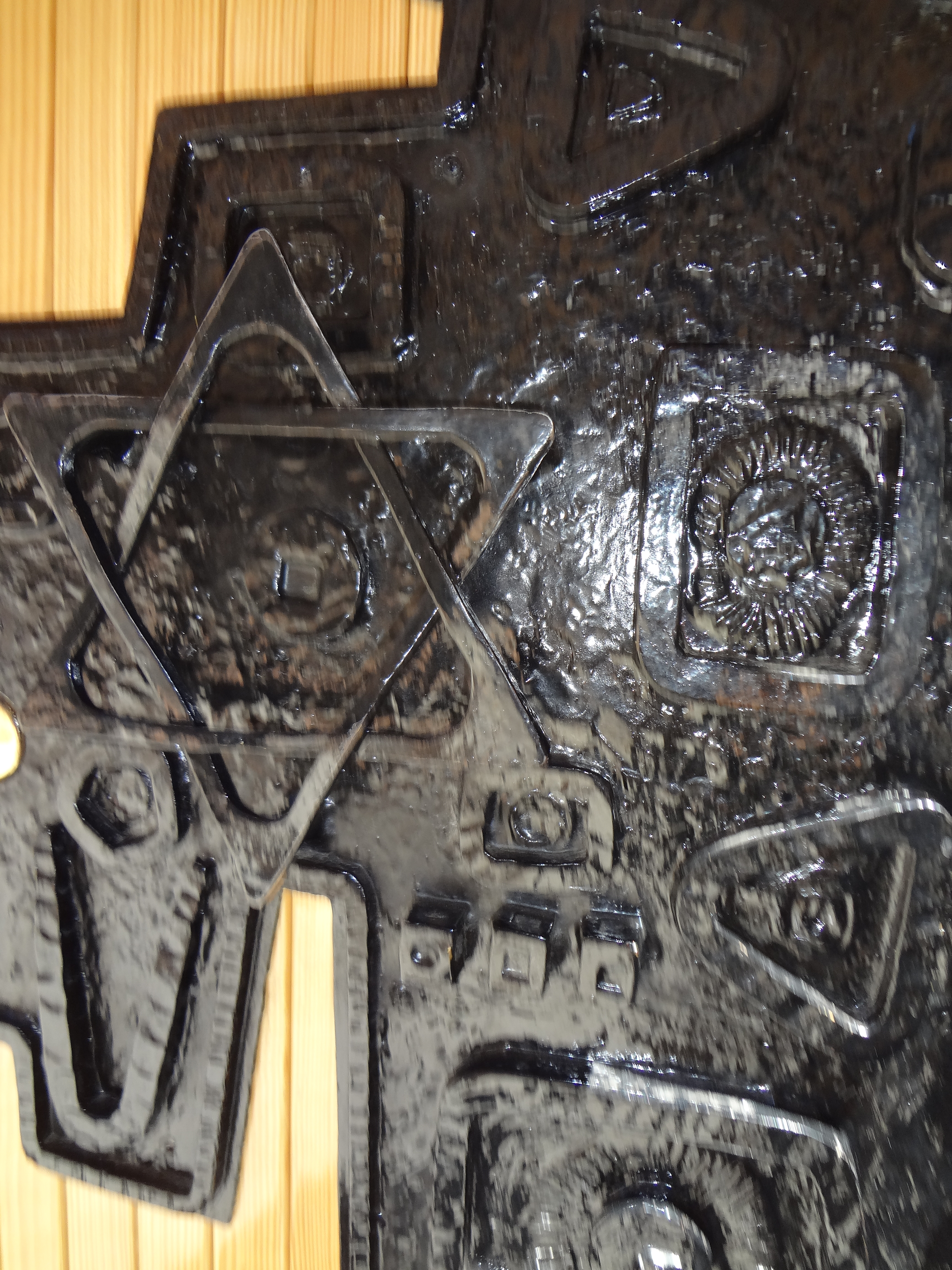
Close up of the entrance door

== See also ==
- History of the Jews in Spain
- List of synagogues in Spain
- Monument to the Victims of the Holocaust (Madrid)
