= Tallado =

Tallado is a surname. Notable people with the surname include:

- Edgar Tallado (born 1963), Filipino politician
- Josefina Tallado, Filipino politician

== See also ==
- Toledo
