= Simon Levy (activist) =

Moroccan Jewish activist, linguist, and anthropologist

Simon Lévy
- شمعون ليفي
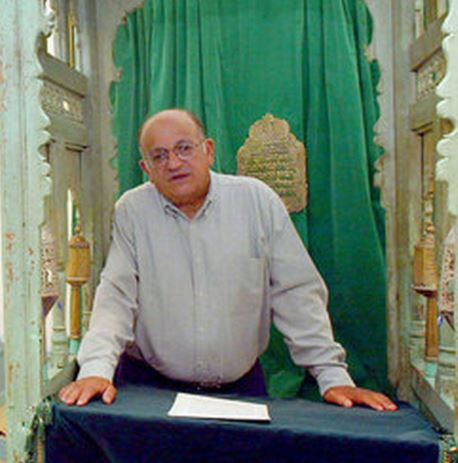
- Born: 1934; Fez, Morocco
- Died: 2 December 2011 (aged 76–77); Rabat, Morocco
- Occupations: Politician; Anthropologist; Linguist

Simon Levy (also written Simon Lévy; Arabic: شمعون ليفي; 1934 – 2 December 2011) was a Moroccan activist, linguist, and anthropologist. Levy was the founder and secretary general of the foundation of Jewish-Moroccan cultural heritage, and the director of Casablanca’s Jewish Museum. He was also a leading figure in the Moroccan Communist Party, and a critic of Israel.

== Biography ==
Simon Levy was born in Fez into a Moroccan Jewish family steeped in the traditional Moroccan Jewish culture. He began to advocate for Moroccan independence in his late teens, and in 1954 joined the Moroccan Workers’ Union, the National Moroccan Student Union, and the Moroccan Communist Party. During the student uprising in 1965 he was abducted and tortured for eight days.

After the suppression of the Moroccan Communist party in the mid-1960s, Levy continued his activism and work with the Party of Progress and Socialism (PPS), and began an academic career as a linguist at Mohammed V University in Rabat. Between 1976 and 1983 he served as an advisor to the Municipal Council of Casablanca. In that capacity, he worked to create local libraries and professional training centres. He edited and contributed to several Moroccan publications, including La Nation (Morocco), Al-Jamahir and Al Bayane. Since 1998 he was the director of the Foundation for Moroccan Jewish Patrimony as well as Casablanca’s historical and ethnographic Museum of Moroccan Judaism.

== Memory ==
In 2014, Mimouna Associations in Morocco decided to create an award in the name of Simon Levy, given to people who have been involved in the preservation of the Jewish Heritage and the promotion of this culture within the young generation, often involving a great deal of commitment on a regular basis.
