= Monument to the Victims of the Holocaust (Madrid) =

Spanish memorial inaugurated in 2007

- Monumento a las víctimas del Holocausto
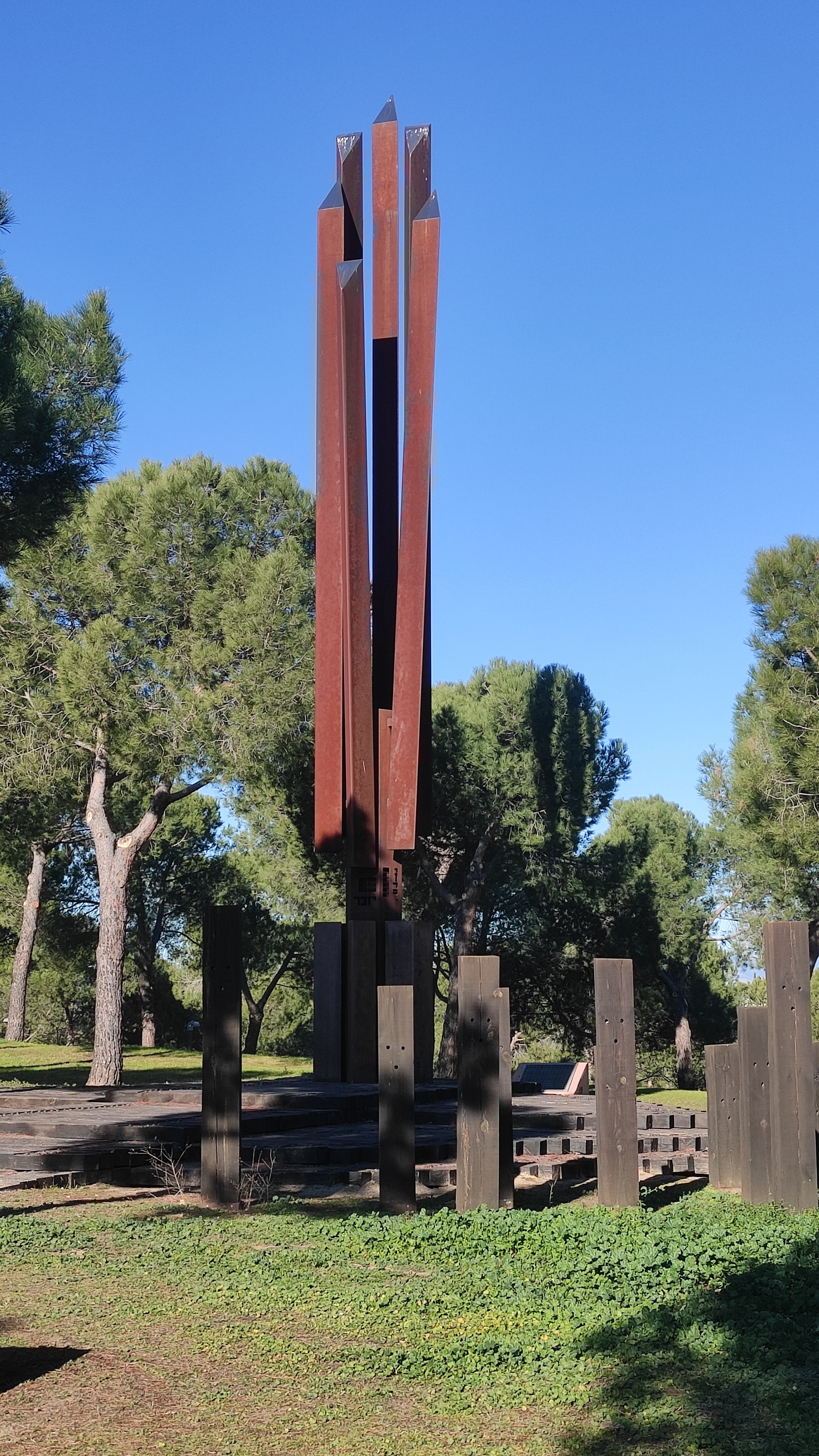
- Interactive map of Monument to the Victims of the Holocaust
- Location: Juan Carlos I Park, Madrid, Spain
- Coordinates: 40°27′50″N 3°36′21″W
- Designer: Samuel Nahon Bengio (sculptor); Alberto Stisin (architect)
- Material: steel and wood railroad ties
- Height: 10 meters
- Completion date: 2007
- Dedicated date: 12 March 2007
- Dedicated to: Victims of the Holocaust

The Monument to the Victims of the Holocaust (Spanish: Monumento a las víctimas del Holocausto) is a monument in Madrid, Spain, in memory of the victims of the Holocaust during World War II. It is located in the Three Cultures Garden (Spanish: Jardín de las Tres Culturas) in Juan Carlos I Park. Inaugurated in 2007, the monument was the first Holocaust memorial in Spain.

== Context and history ==
The establishment of a permanent Holocaust memorial coincided with increased attention to Holocaust remembrance in Spain, between late 2004 and May 2005, ahead of the 60th anniversary of the liberation of Mauthausen concentration camp, where more than 16,000 Spaniards were killed. Mauthausen held thousands of Spanish political prisoners who opposed the Franco regime. On 15 December 2004, Spain established 27 January as the Day for the Remembrance of the Holocaust and the Prevention of Crimes (Spanish: Día Oficial de la Memoria del Holocausto y la Prevención de los Crímenes contra la Humanidad) after a United Nations resolution instituted International Holocaust Remembrance Day.

On 28 April 2005, the week of the anniversary of the liberation, the Madrid City Council unanimously approved the establishment of a Holocaust memorial. In an agreement between the Madrid City Council and the Jewish Community of Madrid (Spanish: Comunidad Judia de Madrid) (CJM), the Jewish community bore the 53,600-euro construction cost as a donation to the city.

Upon completion, the memorial was dedicated by Mayor of Madrid Alberto Ruiz-Gallardón on 12 March 2007. The monument was the first Holocaust memorial in Spain. In 2017, the northwest town of Oviedo became the second city in Spain with a Holocaust memorial.

== Description ==
The monument was created by sculptor Samuel Nahon Bengio, an Israeli of Sephardic Jewish descent. It stands in the Three Cultures Garden in Madrid's Juan Carlos I Park. The garden symbolises the coexistence of Christians, Muslims, and Jews.

Forty-four columns of steel and wooden railroad ties form a Star of David, surrounding a raised platform with 10-meter-high centre column. The railroad ties are nailed upright, directly into the ground, to simulate tombstones in a cemetery.

On one side of the platform is a sculpture made of wooden railroad ties of a father holding his son in his arms. On a pathway leading to the platform is a commemorative bronze plaque with the following inscription:

Spanish

Monumento en recuerdo a las
victimas del Holocausto
en memoria de los seis millones de judíos asesinados
durante la shoá por la barbarie Nazi, así como de las
victimas españolas, gitanas y otros colectivos
igualmente asesinados en los campos de exterminio
15 de abril de 2007 – 27 de Nisán de 5767

English

Monument in remembrance to the
victims of the Holocaust
in memory of the six million Jews murdered
during the Shoah by Nazi barbarism, as well as the
Spanish, Gypsy, and other victimized groups
likewise murdered in the extermination camps
April 15, 2007 – 27 Nisan 5767

== See also ==
- List of Holocaust memorials and museums
