= Samuel Toledano =

Jewish leader in Spain (1929–1996)

Samuel Toledano

Samuel Toledano (August 15, 1929 - July 22, 1996) was a Spanish Jewish community leader and lawyer. As a descendant of an old Jewish family from medieval Toledo, Samuel (Sam) Toledano was a secretary-general and president of Spain's Jewish federation of Israelite communities, later known as the Federation of Jewish Communities of Spain (FCJE) from 1982 to 1994. For 36 years, he was one of the most prominent Jewish leaders in Spain.

== Early life ==
Toledano was born in Tangier on August 15, 1929. He graduated with a law degree from the University of Paris and moved to Spain in 1959.

== Career ==
In 1967, the Spanish authorities (represented by the Spanish ambassador in Cairo) Ángel Sagaz Zubelzu, issued passports for about 1,500 Jews imprisoned in Egypt's Abu Zaabal Prison. He obtained their liberation from Gamal Abdel Nasser's government in response to his request to the vice president of the Jewish community of Madrid and its president, Max Mazin (in office between 1961 and 1970).

Freedom for non-Catholic faiths was achieved on June 19, 1967. As a political consequence in Spain of the Second Vatican Council decisions. Toledano then demanded that the Spanish State give full legal recognition for Spanish Jews and overturn the Spanish Inquisition expulsion order, which was decreed in 1492.

On December 16, 1968, he received from Minister of Justice Antonio Oriol a government proclamation formally revoking the Catholic Monarchs' Alhambra Decree that ordered the expulsion of practicing Jews. That day, the Beth Yaacov Synagogue, the first official synagogue in Madrid since the 1492 decree, was inaugurated.

In 1987 Toledano took part in negotiations between the Government of Spain and representatives of the Jewish and Protestant faiths to grant those faiths the same privileges as the Catholic Church. The agreement was signed in 1990.

On March 31, 1992, he was among the Jewish leaders from around the world who welcomed King Juan Carlos I at his famous visit to a synagogue in Madrid. This royal reconciliation gesture came on the occasion of the 500th anniversary of the Alhambra Decree.

In June 1992, Toledano spoke in the name of the vast "tribe" of Toledano exiled Jewish families around the world and, together with some other 19 representatives, received a symbolic key to the town of Toledo in a historical public ceremony.

Toledano was active in efforts to reconcile the Jewish and the Spanish nations, and in this context, Spain's official recognition in 1987 of the State of Israel and the institution of diplomatic relations at the embassy rank between the two Mediterranean states.

He was a founding member of the Center for Judeo-Christian Studies in Madrid. He was also involved in business, serving as a board member and financial director of Jusan company in Madrid.

== Personal life ==
Toledano was married twice and had two children, Danny and Mauricio Toledano, and three grandchildren.

He died of a heart attack in Madrid, Spain, on July 22, 1996. In his memory, the Samuel Toledano Prize was founded, which is awarded every year by the Misgav Yerushalayim Institute in Jerusalem to people from Spain, Israel, and other countries who contribute to the research of the Sephardic heritage and its Christian and Muslim context.

== Writings ==
- Samuel Toledano, Espagne: les retrouvailles, in: Les Juifs du Maroc (Editions du Scribe) Paris 1992 (article in French in a book about the Jews of Morocco)
