= Juan Carlos I Park =

Sculpture garden and municipal park in Madrid, Spain

- Parque Juan Carlos I
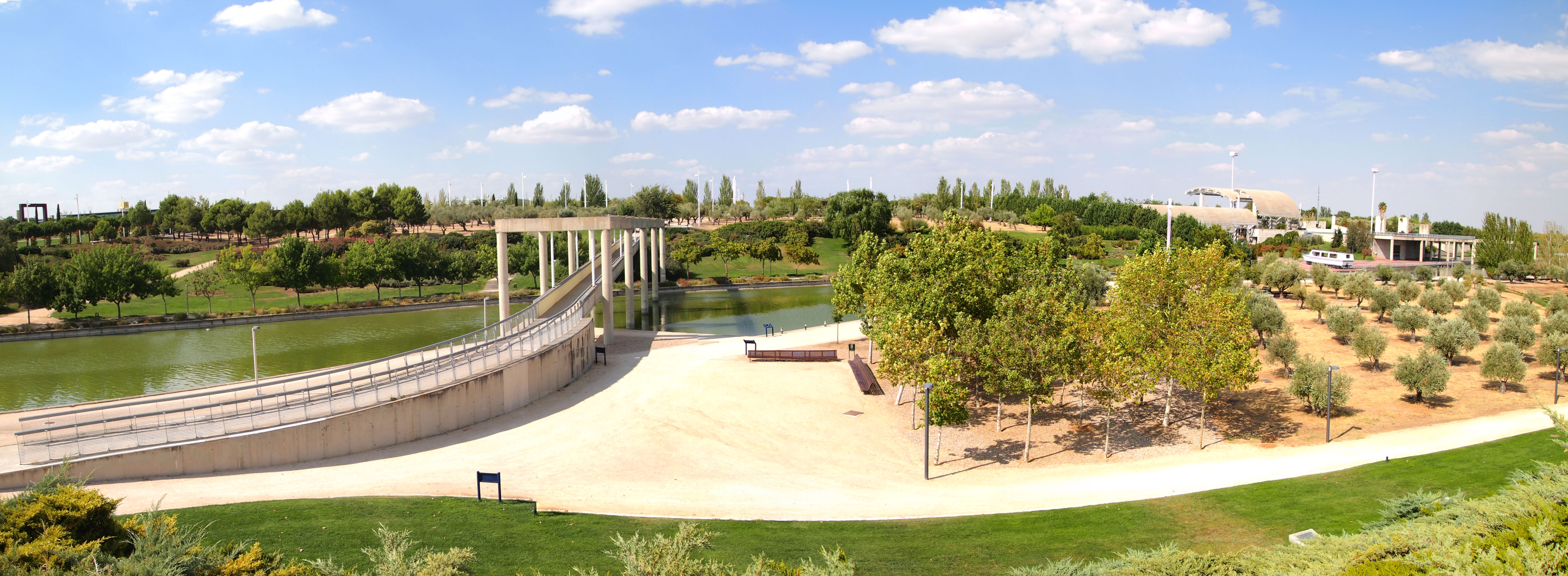

- Location within Madrid Location within Spain
- Coordinates: 40.46011°N 3.60605°W
- Area: 160 ha (400 acres)
- Created: 1992
- Operator: City of Madrid

Juan Carlos I Park (Spanish: Parque Juan Carlos I) is a major municipal park in Madrid, Spain. The park was named after King Juan Carlos I. The park contains many modern sculptures.

The architects and urban designers are Jose Luis Esteban Penelas and Emilio Esteras Martín.

The Music MetroRock festival is regularly held at the Juan Carlos Park.

== Sculptures of Juan Carlos I Park ==
- Fingering (Mario Irarrázaval, Chile, 1994)
- Meetings (Mustafa Arruf, Spain, 1998)
- Eolos (Paul van Hoeydonck, Belgium, 1992)
- Space Mexico (Andres Casillas and Margarita Garcia Cornejo, Mexico, 1992)
- Fisicromía to Madrid (Carlos Cruz Diez, Venezuela, 1992)
- Tribute to Agustín Rodríguez Sahagún (Toshimitsu Imai, Japan, 1992)
- Tribute to Galileo Galilei (Amadeo Gabino, Spain, 1992)
- Monument to the Victims of the Holocaust (Samuel Nahon Bengio, Israel, 2007)
- The songs of the Crossroads (Leopoldo Maler, Argentina, 1992)
- Manolona Opus 397 (Miguel Berrocal, Spain, 1992)
- Monument to Don Juan (Victor Ochoa, Spain, 1994)
- Monument to Peace (Yolanda D'Augsburg, Brazil, 1992)
- My Sky Hole / Madrid (Bukichi Inoue, Japan, 1992)
- Blue Passage (Arghira Alexandru, Romania, 1992)
- Walk between two trees (Jorge Castillo, Spain, 1995)
- Untitled (Dani Karavan, Israel, 1992)
- Untitled (José Miguel Utande, Spain, 1992)
- Inner journey (Michael Warren, Ireland, 1992)
- Beam (Jorge du Bon, Mexico, 1992)

Preceded by Mandalay Bay	Fed Cup; Final Four venue 2001	Succeeded by Palacio de Congresos de Maspalomas
