= Toledano =

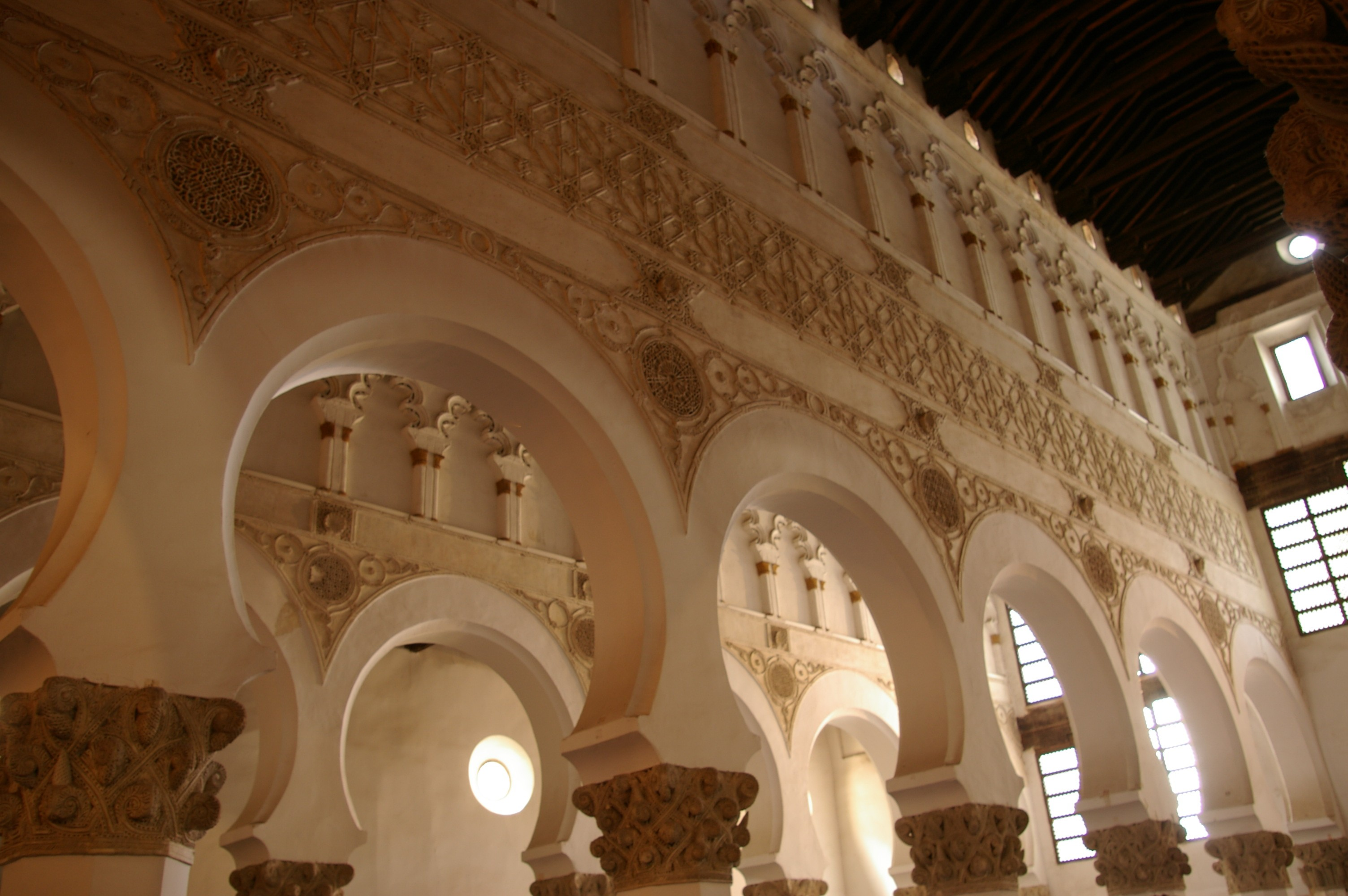

Origin
- Languages: Spanish, Ladino
- Meaning: "Toledan" "from Toledo (or from Reino de Toledo)"
- Region of origin: Spain, Morocco, Greece, Israel, France; Spanish-speaking countries

Other names
- Variant forms: Toledani; Toledo, de Toledo

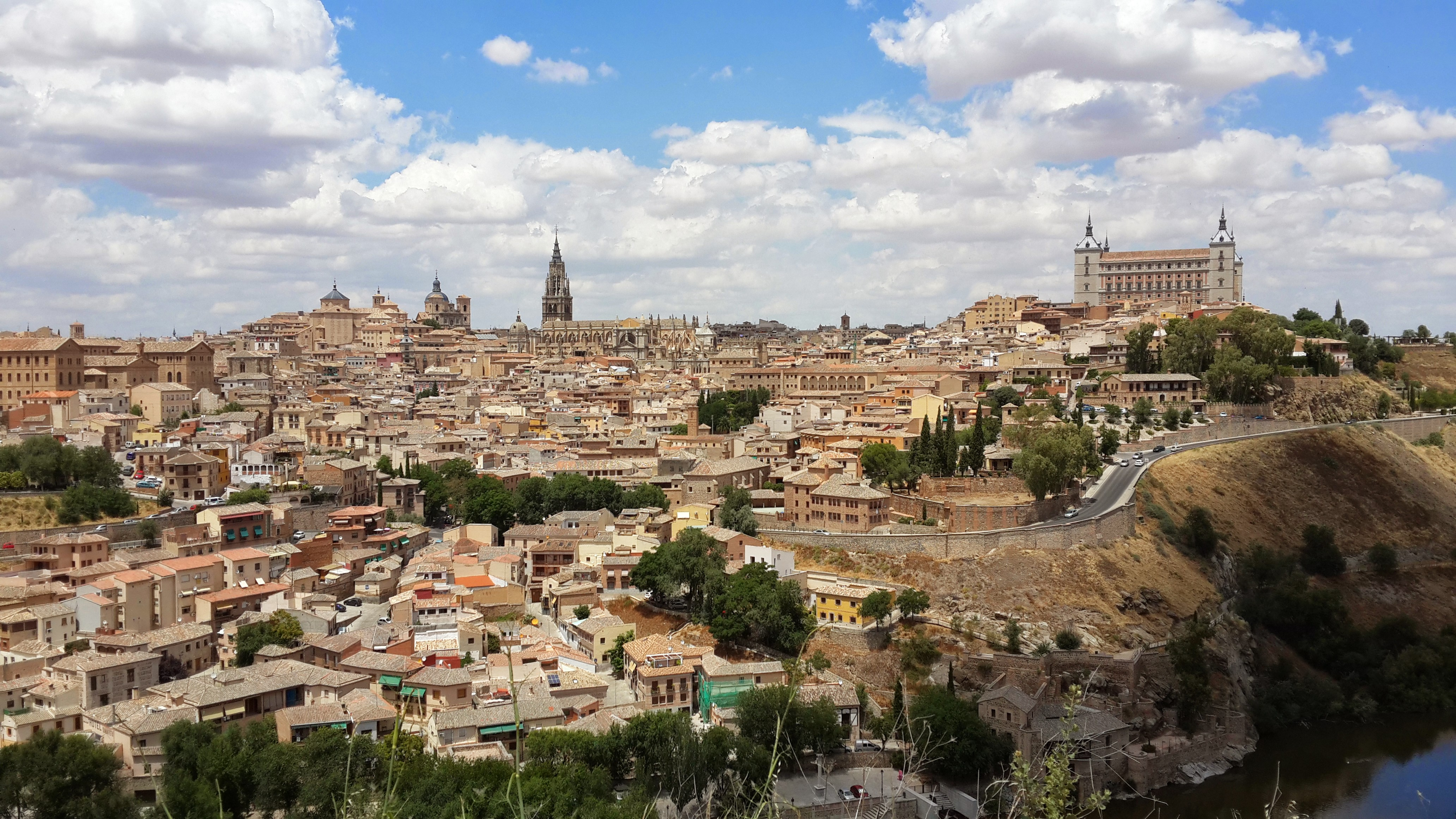
The city of Toledo, Spain where the Toledano family name originated.

Toledano (Hebrew: טולדנו, Ladino: טולידאנו) is a family name derived from the city of Toledo, Spain. Bearers of the name can be found mainly in Spanish-speaking countries, the United States, France, Canada, Israel, and Australia. The surname is also found among Sephardi Jews in their various diasporas, indicating possible ancestry traced back to Toledo, Spain. The Toledano name was also retained among non-Jews in various Spanish-speaking countries. The Jewish Toledanos were expelled from Spain in 1492. After the expulsion from Spain the Toledanos went to Safed, Salonika, and Morocco. They arrived in Fez, Morocco during the 16th century from Salonika and from there went to Meknes and became leaders of the community from the 16th century until the present day.

== Notable bearers ==
- Avi Toledano (born 1948), Moroccan-Israeli singer
- Avraham Toledano, Mashgiach ruchani of the Yeshivat Haraayon Hayehudi
- Drew Tal (born Dror Toledano, 1957), photographer and artist in New York City
- Ehud R. Toledano, historian
- Éric Toledano (born 1971), French film director and actor
- Fernando Usero Toledano (born 1984), Spanish footballer
- Haham Pinchas Toledano, chief rabbi of Amsterdam
- José Antolin Toledano (1936–2022), Spanish industrialist
- Hilda Toledano (a literary pseudonym; 1907–1995)
- Michael Toledano, Canadian documentary filmmaker
- Ralph de Toledano (1916–2007), Jewish Moroccan-American political activist
- Ralph Toledano (born 1951) French-Moroccan businessman
- Samuel Toledano (1929– 1996), Jewish Moroccan-Spanish community leader
- Shmuel Toledano (1921–2022), Israeli Mossad employee and politician
- Sidney Toledano (born 1951), CEO of Christian Dior
- Vicente Lombardo Toledano (1894–1968), Mexican politician and teacher
- Ya'akov Moshe Toledano (1880–1960), Israeli Sephardic-haredi rabbi, chief rabbi of Cairo, Alexandria and Tel Aviv
- Yuriorkis Gamboa Toledano (born 1981), Cuban boxer

== See also ==
- Tullis-Toledano Manor (also known as the Toledano-Philbrick-Tullis House), a red clay brick mansion
- Toledana
- Toledo (disambiguation)
