= Toledo (band) =

American indie rock duo

- Origin: Newburyport, Massachusetts, U.S.
- Genres: Indie rock; Indie folk
- Years active: 2013–present
- Labels: Grand Jury Records; Telefono Records
- Members: Daniel Alvarez de Toledo; Jordan Dunn-Pilz
- Website: thebandtoledo.com

Toledo, stylized as TOLEDO, is an American indie rock duo from Newburyport, Massachusetts, now based in Brooklyn, New York. The duo consists of Daniel Alvarez de Toledo and Jordan Dunn-Pilz, who met while busking in the streets of their hometown.

== History ==
Toledo released their first EP in early 2019, titled Hot Stuff. The duo's second EP, Jockeys of Love, was released on February 12, 2021. In June 2022, Toledo released a new song called "L-Train". In the fall of 2022, Toledo released their debut full-length album, How It Ends, through Grand Jury Records. In February 2023, the duo announced "How It Ends [UNRATED EDITION], a deluxe edition of their debut album, due out March 31. Alongside the announcement, they released the song "Oak Hill".

== Discography ==
Studio albums

- How It Ends (2022, Grand Jury)

EPs

- Inertia (2025, self-released)
- Popped Heart (2024, self-released)
- Hot Stuff (2019, Telefono)
- Jockeys of Love (2021, Telefono)

== Tours ==
=== Headlining ===
- Not From Ohio Tour (2025)
- How It Ends Tour (2023)
