= Federation of Jewish Communities of Spain =

Jewish umbrella organization in Spain

- Formation: 1964; 62 years ago
- Headquarters: Madrid, Spain
- Region served: Spain
- President: David Obadia Chocrón
- Parent organization: World Jewish Congress; European Jewish Congress
- Website: www.fcje.org

The Federation of Jewish Communities of Spain (FCJE; Spanish: Federación de Comunidades Judías de España) is the umbrella organization representing the interests of most Jews in Spain. Domestically, the FCJE is the official voice of the Spanish Jewish community to the Spanish government. Internationally, the FCJE is the Spanish representative to the European Jewish Congress and World Jewish Congress. In 2021, the FCJE estimated there were between 40,000 and 45,000 Jews in Spain, 98.5% of which are estimated to be part of communities represented by the FCJE.

== Activities ==
Under Law 25/1992 (Agreement of Cooperation between the State and the Israelite Communities of Spain) enacted on November 10, 1992, the Federation of Jewish Communities in Spain (FCJE) is the only state-recognized umbrella organization representing the Jewish community of Spain. As such, the FCJE oversees the Superior Rabbinical Council of Spain (CSRE) (Spanish: Consejo Rabínico Superior de España), the application of Kashrut dietary laws, the certification of Jewish marriages, and Jewish burials in the county. The cooperation agreement between the FCJE and the Spanish government does not allow for publicly funded services, such as religious services and observances. The FCJE has declined government funding for Jewish instructors.

The FCJE assisted the Spanish government with the implementation of the 2015 law offering Sephardi Jews of Spanish origin the ability to obtain Spanish nationality by naturalization.

== History ==
=== Organized Jewish communities (late 19th to early 20th century) ===
During Spain's Restoration era that began in 1874, the country's small Jewish community began to emerge from the shadows. The communities in Ceuta and Melilla, Spanish autonomous cities on the north coast of Africa, began to organize by the 19th century. Jewish life on the Spanish peninsula in the country's major cities existed in the latter decades of the 19th century, but only coalesced into organized bodies around the time of World War I. Synagogues in Seville, Madrid (1917), and Barcelona (1914) were established.

After World War I, the Spanish government continued rapprochement with its Jewish community. In 1924, Prime Minister Miguel Primo de Rivera decreed that Sephardim who met certain provisions would be granted Spanish nationality.

=== Spanish Civil War and Francist Spain (1936–1975) ===
Representatives of Spain's Jewish community of Spain attended the inaugural plenary of the World Jewish Congress in Geneva in 1936.

During the Spanish Civil War (1936-1939), as many as 10,000 Jews came from Europe, Palestine, and America to join the International Brigades supporting the forces of the Second Spanish Republic against Francisco Franco's Nationalists. After Franco's victory in 1939, the Spanish right-wing moved against so-called "enemy elements" that comprised an "anti-Spain" working in the interests of Bolsheviks and a "Judeo-Masonic conspiracy". The government shut down the synagogues in Madrid and Barcelona. Jewish marriages and brit milah were outlawed, and Jewish children were compelled to attend Catholic schools.

In 1945, the Francoist government enacted the Fuero de los Españoles as the fourth of the ultimately eight Fundamental Laws of the Realm, extendeding the right to private worship of non-Catholic religions, including Judaism. However, the erection of religious buildings or non-Catholic public ceremonies remained forbidden. Thus while the Jewish communities in Madrid and Barcelona began again to quietly practice their religion, they still operated outside the law. In 1964, the Jewish community was legalized not as a religious community, but as a political entity, as part of Franco's "25 years of peace" celebration. That year, the Jewish communities in Madrid and Barcelona created the Israeli Communal Council. The group's first secretary-general was Carlos Benarroch. That year, the council affiliated with the World Jewish Congress.

Spain's 1967 Law on Religious Freedom granted full public religious rights to non-Catholics, including Jews. Under the law's framework, Jewish communities were formed in Malaga, Alicante, Valencia, Palma de Mallorca, Tenerife, Las Palmas, Torremolinos, and Marbella.

=== Post-Franco and formation of FCJE (after 1975) ===
The 1978 Constitution of Spain and the 1980 Organic Law on Religious Freedom created a new framework for religious minorities, establishing state-sponsored religious pluralism for religious denominations with "notorious roots" in Spain. To obtain the "notorious roots" designation and sign agreements with the state, religious groups had to join in a single federation. On July 16, 1982, the Federation of Israelite Communities of Spain (Spanish: Consejo Comunal Israelita) was formed by the Jewish communities of Barcelona, Ceuta, Madrid, and Melilla.

By March 1992, the federation represented approximately 15,000 Jews in Spain, most of whom first- or second-generation immigrants from North Africa and South America.

In 2004, the organization changed its name to the Federation of Jewish Communities in Spain (Spanish: Federación de Comunidades Judías de España).

== Presidents of FCJE ==
- Samuel Toledano (1982)
- Carlos Schorr (1994–2003)
- Jacobo Israel Garzón (2003–2011)
- Isaac Querub Caro (2011–2020)
- Isaac Benzaquén Pinto (2020–2024)
- David Obadia Chocrón (2024–present)

== See also ==
- Antisemitism in Spain
- Beth Yaacov Synagogue (Madrid)
- Yehuda Benasouli
