= Alhambra Decree =

1492 decree expelling Jews from Spain

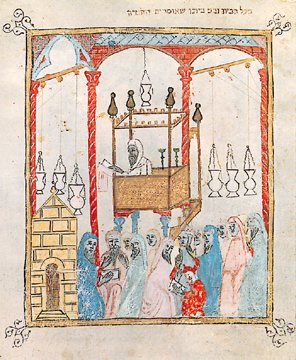
A service in a Spanish synagogue, from the Sister Haggadah (c. 1350). The Alhambra Decree would bring Spanish Jewish life to a sudden end.

The Alhambra Decree (also known as the Edict of Expulsion; Spanish: Decreto de la Alhambra, Edicto de Granada) was an edict issued on 31 March 1492 by the joint Catholic Monarchs of Spain, Isabella I of Castile and Ferdinand II of Aragon, ordering the expulsion of unconverted Jews from the Crowns of Castile and Aragon and its territories and possessions by 31 July of that year. Its primary purpose was to minimize the influence of the remaining Jews on Spain's large converso New Christian population, converted from Judaism, to minimize the possibility that the latter and their descendants would be able to secretly practice their former faith.

Over half of Spain's Jews had converted as a result of the religious persecution and pogroms which occurred in 1391. Due to continuing attacks, around 50,000 more had converted by 1415. A further number of those remaining chose to convert to avoid expulsion. As a result of the Alhambra Decree and persecution in the years leading up to the expulsion of Spain's estimated 300,000 Jewish origin population, a total of over 200,000 had converted to Catholicism in order to remain in Spain, and between 40,000 and 100,000 remained Jewish and suffered expulsion. An unknown number of the expelled eventually succumbed to the pressures of life in exile away from formerly-Jewish relatives and networks back in Spain, and so converted to Catholicism to be allowed to return in the years following expulsion.^{:17}

In 1924, the regime of Primo de Rivera granted Spanish citizenship to a part of the Sephardic Jewish diaspora, though few people benefited from it in practice. The decree was then formally and symbolically revoked on 16 December 1968 by the regime of Francisco Franco, following the Second Vatican Council. This was a full century after Jews had been openly practising their religion in Spain and synagogues were once more legal places of worship under Spain's Laws of Religious Freedom.

In 2015, the government of Spain passed a law allowing dual citizenship to Jewish descendants who apply, to "compensate for shameful events in the country's past". Thus, Sephardic Jews who could prove that they are the descendants of those Jews expelled from Spain because of the Alhambra Decree would "become Spaniards without leaving home or giving up their present nationality". The Spanish law expired in 2019, and new applications for Spanish citizenship on the basis of Sephardic Jewish family heritage are no longer allowed. However, the descendants of the Jews exiled from the Iberian Peninsula may still apply for Portuguese citizenship.

== Background ==
By the end of the 8th century, Arab Muslim forces had conquered and settled most of the Iberian Peninsula. Under Islamic law, the Jews, who had lived in the region since at least Roman times, were considered "People of the Book" and treated as dhimmi, which was a protected status. Compared to the repressive policies of the Visigothic Kingdom, who, starting in the sixth century had enacted a series of anti-Jewish statutes which culminated in their forced conversion and enslavement, the tolerance of the Muslim Moorish rulers of al-Andalus allowed Jewish communities to thrive. Jewish merchants were able to trade freely across the Islamic world, which allowed them to flourish, and made Jewish enclaves in Muslim Iberian cities great centers of learning and commerce. This led to a flowering of Jewish culture in Spain during the Middle Ages, as Jewish scholars were able to gain favor in Muslim courts as skilled physicians, diplomats, translators, and poets. Although Jews never enjoyed equal status to Muslims, in some Taifas, such as Granada, Jewish men were appointed to very high offices, including that of Grand vizier.

The Reconquista, or the gradual reconquest of Muslim Iberia by the Christian kingdoms in the North, was driven by a powerful religious motivation: to reclaim Iberia for Christendom following the Umayyad conquest of Hispania centuries before. By the 14th century, most of the Iberian Peninsula (present-day Spain and Portugal) had been reconquered by the Christian kingdoms of Castile, Aragon, León, Galicia, Navarre, and Portugal.

During the Christian re-conquest of Iberia, the Muslim kingdoms in Spain became less welcoming to the dhimmi. In the late 12th century, the Muslims in al-Andalus invited the fanatical Almohad dynasty from North Africa to push the Christians back to the North. After they gained control of the Iberian Peninsula, the Almohads offered the Jews a choice between expulsion, conversion, and death. Many Jewish people fled to other parts of the Muslim world, and also to the Christian kingdoms, which initially welcomed them. In Christian Spain, Jews functioned as courtiers, government officials, merchants, and moneylenders. Therefore, the Jewish community was both useful to the ruling classes and to an extent protected by them.

As the Reconquista drew to a close, overt hostility against Jews in Christian Spain became more pronounced, finding expression in brutal episodes of violence and oppression. In the early fourteenth century, the Christian kings vied to prove their piety by allowing the clergy to subject the Jewish population to forced sermons and disputations. More deadly attacks came later in the century from mobs of angry Catholics, led by popular preachers, who would storm into the Jewish quarter, destroy synagogues, and break into houses, forcing the inhabitants to choose between conversion and death. Thousands of Jews sought to escape these attacks by converting to Christianity. These Jewish converts were commonly called conversos, Cristianos nuevos, or marranos; the latter term was used as an insult. At first, these conversions seemed an effective solution to the cultural conflict: many converso families met with social and commercial success. But eventually their success made these new Catholics unpopular with their neighbors, including some of the clergy of the Catholic Church and Spanish aristocrats competing with them for influence over the royal families. By the mid-15th century, the demands of the Old Christians that the Catholic Church and the monarchy differentiate them from the conversos led to the first limpieza de sangre laws, which restricted opportunities for converts.

These suspicions on the part of Christians were only heightened by the fact that some of the conversions were insincere. Some conversos, also known as crypto-Jews, embraced Christianity and underwent baptism while privately adhering to Jewish practices and faith. Recently converted families who continued to intermarry were especially viewed with suspicion. For their part, the Jewish community viewed conversos with compassion, because Jewish law held that conversion under threat of violence was not necessarily legitimate. Although the Catholic Church was also officially opposed to forced conversion, under ecclesiastical law all baptisms were lawful, and once baptized, converts were not allowed to rejoin their former religion.

=== European context ===
Expulsions of Jews in Europe from 1100 to 1600

From the thirteenth to the sixteenth centuries, European countries expelled the Jews from their territories on at least fifteen occasions. Before the Spanish expulsion, the Jews had been expelled from England in 1290, several times from France between 1182 and 1354, and from some German states. The French case is typical of most expulsions: whether the expulsion was local or national, the Jews usually were allowed to return after a few years. The Spanish expulsion was succeeded by at least five expulsions from other European countries, but the expulsion of the Jews from Spain was both the largest of its kind and, officially, the longest lasting in western European history.

Over the four-hundred-year period during which most of these decrees were implemented, the causes of expulsion gradually changed. At first, expulsions of Jews (or absence of expulsions) were exercises of royal prerogatives. Jewish communities in medieval Europe often were protected by and associated with monarchs because, under the feudal system, Jews often were a monarch's only reliable source of taxes. Jews further had reputations as moneylenders because they were the only social group allowed to loan money at a profit under the prevailing interpretation of the Vulgate (the Latin translation of the Bible used in Catholic western Europe as the official text), which forbade Christians to charge interest on loans. Jews, therefore, became the lenders to and creditors of merchants, aristocrats, and even monarchs. Most expulsions before the Alhambra Decree were related to this financial situation: to raise additional monies, a monarch would tax the Jewish community heavily, forcing Jews to call in loans; the monarch then would expel the Jews; at the time of expulsion, the monarch would seize their remaining valuable assets, including debts owed them by other subjects of the monarch and, in some instances, by the monarch himself. Expulsion of the Jews from Spain was thus an innovation not only in scale but also in its motivations.

=== Ferdinand and Isabella ===
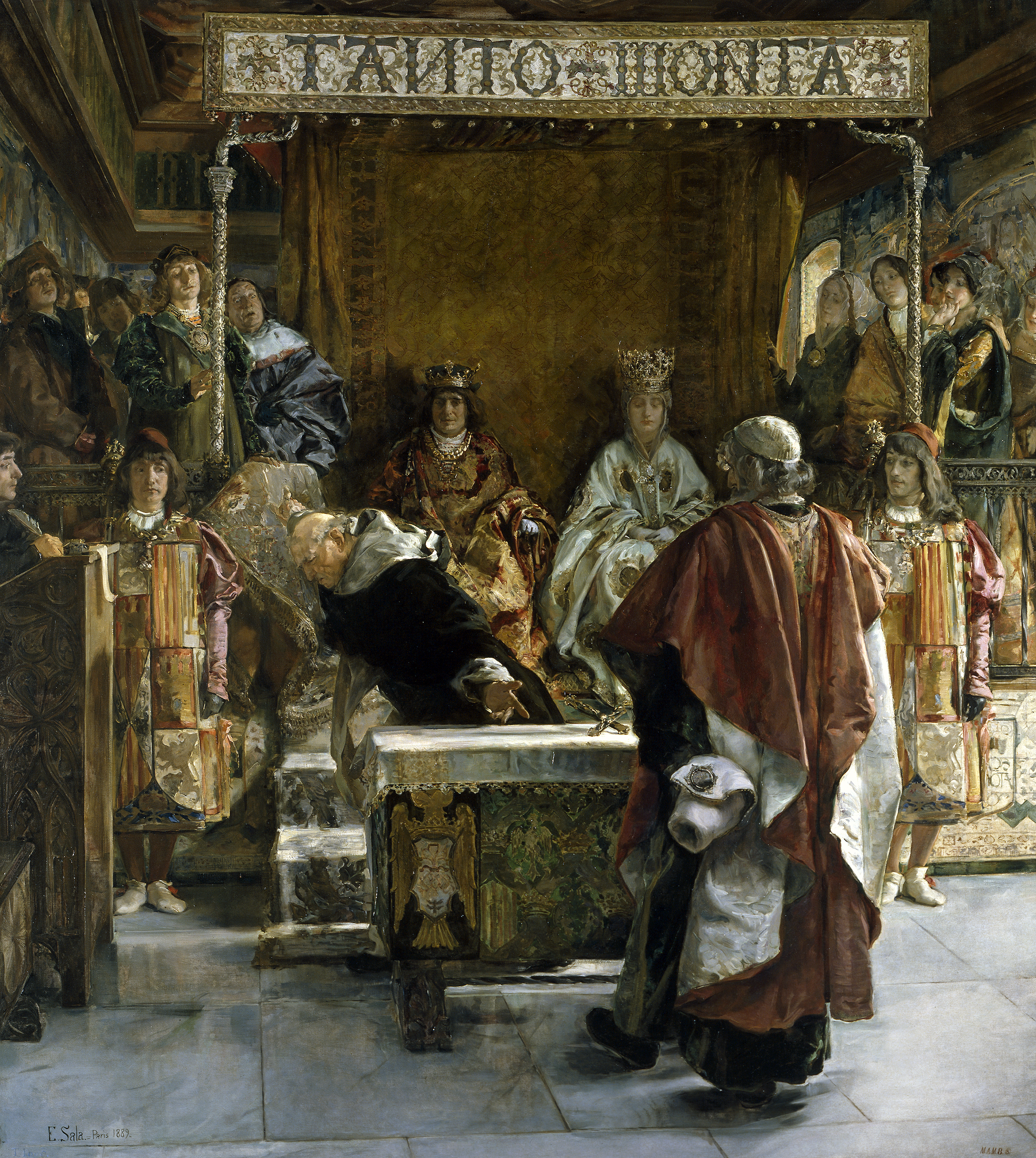
Expulsion of the Jews from Spain in 1492 by Emilio Sala Francés

Hostility towards the Jews in Spain was brought to a climax during the reign of the "Catholic Monarchs", Ferdinand and Isabella. Their marriage in 1469, which formed a personal union of the crowns of Aragon and Castile, with coordinated policies between their distinct kingdoms, eventually led to the final unification of Spain.

Although their initial policies towards the Jews were protective, Ferdinand and Isabella were disturbed by reports claiming that most Jewish converts to Christianity were insincere in their conversion. As mentioned above, some claims that conversos continued to practice Judaism in secret were true, but the "Old" Christians exaggerated the scale of the phenomenon. It was also claimed that Jews were trying to draw conversos back into the Jewish fold. In 1478, Ferdinand and Isabella made a formal application to Rome to set up an Inquisition in Castile to investigate these and other suspicions. In 1487, King Ferdinand promoted the establishment of the Spanish Inquisition Tribunals in Castile. In the Crown of Aragon, it had been first instituted in the 13th century to combat the Albigensian heresy. However, the focus of this new Inquisition was to find and punish conversos who were practicing Judaism in secret.

These issues came to a head during Ferdinand and Isabella's final conquest of Granada. The independent Islamic Emirate of Granada had been a tributary state to Castile since 1238. Jews and conversos played an important role during this campaign because they had the ability to raise money and acquire weapons through their extensive trade networks. This perceived increase in Jewish influence further infuriated the Old Christians and the hostile elements of the clergy. Finally, in 1491 in preparation for an imminent transition to Castilian territory, the Treaty of Granada was signed by Emir Muhammad XI and the Queen of Castile, protecting the religious freedom of the Muslims there. By 1492, Ferdinand and Isabella had won the Battle of Granada and completed the Catholic Reconquista of the Iberian Peninsula from Islamic forces. However, the Jewish population emerged from the campaign more hated by the populace and less useful to the monarchs.

== Decree ==
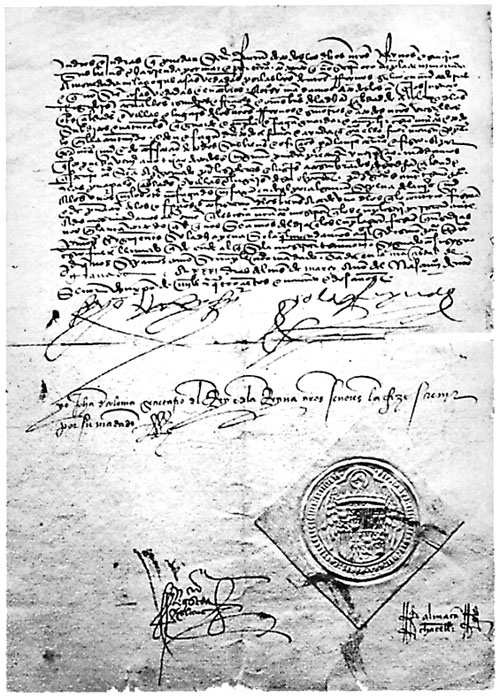
A signed copy of the Edict of Expulsion

The king and queen issued the Alhambra Decree less than three months after the surrender of Granada. Although Isabella was the force behind the decision, her husband Ferdinand did not oppose it. That her confessor had just changed from the tolerant Hernando de Talavera to the very intolerant Francisco Jiménez de Cisneros suggests an increase in royal hostility towards the Jews.

The text of the decree stated, that despite previous attempts to segregate Jews into separate quarters and the ongoing Inquisition, interaction between Jews and Christians persisted. It accused Jews of trying "to subvert the holy Catholic faith" by attempting to "draw faithful Christians away from their beliefs", by teaching them Jewish laws, rituals, and beliefs, providing religious materials and ritually prepared food, performing circumcisions, and ultimately convincing them that Judaism is the only true faith, causing great harm to Catholicism.

The document argued that the only effective remedy was the complete removal of Jews, since by their "diabolical astuteness" they "continually wage war against us. ... Because whenever any grave and detestable crime is committed by members of any organization ... it is reasonable that such an organization ... should be dissolved and annihilated." Therefore, the monarchs decreed that all Jews of any age, residing in their kingdom, must depart and were forbidden to ever return, under penalty of death and confiscation of all property. Anyone assisting or sheltering Jews also faced severe penalties, including loss of possessions and titles.

After the decree was passed, Spain's entire Jewish population was given only four months to either convert to Christianity or leave the country. The edict promised the Jews royal protection and security for the effective three-month window before the deadline. They were permitted to take their belongings with them, excluding "gold or silver or minted money or other things prohibited by the laws of our kingdoms." In practice, however, the Jews had to sell anything they could not carry: their land, their houses, and their libraries, and converting their wealth to a more portable form proved difficult. The market in Spain was saturated with these goods, which meant the prices were artificially lowered for the months before the deadline. As a result, much of the wealth of the Jewish community remained in Spain. The punishment for any Jew who did not convert or leave by the deadline was summary execution.

=== Dispersal ===
The Sephardi Jews migrated to four major areas: North Africa, the Ottoman Empire, Portugal, and Italy. Some Spanish Jews who emigrated to avoid conversion dispersed throughout the region of North Africa known as the Maghreb. The Jewish scholars and physicians among previous Sephardic immigrants to this area had reinvigorated the Jewish communities in North Africa. However, in the 1490s, parts of the Mediterranean world, including Morocco were experiencing severe famine. As a result, a number of cities in Morocco refused to let the Spanish Jews in. This led to mass starvation among the refugees, and made the Jewish refugees vulnerable to the predation of slavers, although the regional ruler invalidated many of these sales within a few years. A good number of the Jews who had fled to North Africa returned to Spain and converted. The Jews who stayed in North Africa often intermingled with the already existing Mizrahi Arabic or Berber speaking communities, becoming the ancestors of the Moroccan, Algerian, Tunisian and Libyan Jewish communities.

Many Spanish Jews also fled to the Ottoman Empire, where they were given refuge. Sultan Bayezid II of the Ottoman Empire, learning about the expulsion of Jews from Spain, dispatched the Ottoman Navy to bring the Jews safely to Ottoman lands, mainly to the cities of Thessaloniki (currently in Greece) and İzmir (currently in Turkey). Many of these Jews also settled in other parts of the Balkans ruled by the Ottomans such as the areas that are now Bulgaria, Serbia and Bosnia. Concerning this incident, Bayezid II is alleged to have commented, "those who say that Ferdinand and Isabella are wise are indeed fools; for he gives me, his enemy, his national treasure, the Jews."

A majority of Sephardim migrated to Portugal, where they gained only a few years of respite from persecution. About 600 Jewish families were allowed to stay in Portugal following an exorbitant bribe until the Portuguese king entered negotiations to marry the daughter of Ferdinand and Isabella. Caught between his desire for an alliance with Spain and his economic reliance on the Jews, Manuel I declared the Jewish community in Portugal (perhaps then some 10% of that country's population) Christians by royal decree unless they left the country. In return, he promised the Inquisition would not come to Portugal for 40 years. He then seized the Jews who tried to leave and had them forcibly baptized, after separating them from their children. It was years before the Jews who fled to Portugal were allowed to emigrate. When the ban was lifted, many of them fled to the Low Countries, the Netherlands or Italy. Some 9,000 Jews had already made their way to Italy in 1492, where they went especially to the kingdom of Naples, the duchy of Ferrara and the Papal States. Pope Alexander VI allowed the refugees to settle in Rome against the protest of the local Jewish community and the exhortations of king Ferdinand to also expel the Jews from the Papal states.

Throughout history, scholars have given widely differing numbers of Jews expelled from Spain. However, the figure is likely to be below the 100,000 Jews who had not yet converted to Christianity by 1492, possibly as low as 40,000. Such figures exclude the significant number of Jews who returned to Spain due to the hostile reception they received in their countries of refuge, notably Fes (Morocco). The situation of returnees was legalized with the Ordinance of 10 November 1492 which established that civil and church authorities should be witnesses to baptism and, in the case that they were baptized before arrival, proof and witnesses of baptism were required. Furthermore, all property could be recovered by returnees at the same price at which it was sold. Similarly the Provision of the Royal Council of 24 October 1493 set harsh sanctions for those who slandered these New Christians with insulting terms such as tornadizos.^{:115} After all, the Catholic monarchs were concerned with the souls of their subjects, and Catholic doctrine held that the persecution of converts would remove an important incentive for conversion. Returnees are documented as late as 1499.

=== Conversions ===
A majority of Spain's Jewish population had converted to Christianity during the waves of religious persecutions prior to the Decree — a total of 200,000 converts according to Joseph Pérez. The main objective of the expulsion of practicing Jews was ensuring the sincerity of the conversions of such a large convert population. Of the 100,000 Jews that remained true to their faith by 1492, an additional number chose to convert and join the converso community rather than face expulsion. Recent conversos were subject to additional suspicion by the Inquisition, which had been established to persecute religious heretics, but in Spain and Portugal was focused on finding crypto-Jews. Although Judaism was not considered a heresy, professing Christianity while engaging in Jewish practices was heretical. Additionally, Limpieza de sangre statutes instituted legal discrimination against converso descendants, barring them from certain positions and forbidding them from emigrating to the Americas. For years, families with urban origins who had extensive trade connections, and people who were learned and multilingual were suspected of having Jewish ancestry. According to the prejudice of the time, a person with Jewish blood was untrustworthy and inferior. Such measures slowly faded away as converso identity was forgotten and this community merged into Spain's dominant Catholic culture. This process lasted until the eighteenth century, with a few exceptions, most notably the Chuetas of the island of Mallorca, where discrimination lasted into the early 20th century.

A Y chromosome DNA test conducted by the University of Leicester and the Pompeu Fabra University has indicated an average of nearly 20% for Spaniards having some direct patrilineal descent from populations from the Near East which colonized the region either in historical times, such as Jews and Phoenicians, or during earlier prehistoric Neolithic migrations. Between the 90,000 Jews who converted under the Visigoth persecutions, and the 100,000+ Jews who converted in the years leading up to expulsion, it is likely that many of these people have Jewish ancestry. Genetic studies have explored local beliefs in the American Southwest that Spanish Americans are the descendants of conversos.

== Modern Spanish policy ==
The Spanish government has actively pursued a policy of reconciliation with the descendants of its expelled Jews. In 1924, the regime of Primo de Rivera granted the possibility of obtaining Spanish citizenship to a part of the Sephardic Jewish diaspora. As stated above, the Alhambra decree was officially revoked in 1968, after the Second Vatican Council rejected the charge of deicide traditionally attributed to the Jews. In 1992, in a ceremony marking the 500th anniversary of the Edict of Expulsion, King Juan Carlos (wearing a yarmulke) prayed alongside Israeli president Chaim Herzog and members of the Jewish community in the Beth Yaacov Synagogue. The King said, "Sefarad (the Hebrew name for Spain) isn't a nostalgic memory anymore; it is a place where it must not be said that Jews should simply 'feel' at home there, for indeed Hispano-Jews are at home in Spain. ... What matters is not accountability for what we may have done wrong or right, but the willingness to look to the future, and analyze the past in light of our future."

From November 2012 Sephardi Jews have had the right to automatic Spanish nationality without the requirement of residence in Spain. Prior to November 2012, Sephardi Jews already had the right to obtain Spanish citizenship after a reduced residency period of two years (versus ten years for foreigners but similar to nationals from Philippines, Equatorial Guinea, Brazil and about 20 other American republics that also require 2 years). While their citizenship was being processed, Sephardi Jews were entitled to the consular protection of the Kingdom of Spain. This makes Spain unique among European nations as the only nation that currently grants automatic citizenship to the descendants of Jews expelled during the European medieval evictions. Although these measures are popular in the Jewish community, they have also sparked some controversy. A minority of thinkers hold that these policies represent less the abnegation of prejudice as a shift to Philo-Semitism. As of November 2015, 4300 Sephardi Jews have benefited from this law and acquired Spanish citizenship, swearing allegiance to the Spanish Constitution. In 2013, the number of Jews in Spain was estimated to range between 40,000 and 50,000 people. Goldschläger and Orjuela have explored the motivations to request citizenship and the ways in which legal provisions, religious associations, and the migration industry become gatekeepers of and (re)shape what it means to be Sephardic.

== See also ==
- Edict of Expulsion
- Edict of Fontainebleau
- Expulsion of Jews from Spain
- Expulsions of the Jews from France
- Forced conversions of Muslims in Spain, a series of similar decrees affecting Muslims
- Expulsion of the Jews from Sicily
- Expulsion of the Moriscos
- Expulsions of Protestants from Salzburg
