= Toledo (surname) =

Toledo is a surname of Spanish origin, after the city of Toledo. Notable people with the surname include:

== Historical ==
- Saint Casilda of Toledo (died 1050), Spanish Catholic Saint
- Eleonora di Garzia di Toledo (1553–1576), wife of Pietro de' Medici
- Eleanor of Toledo (1522–1562), Duchess of Florence, wife of Cosimo I
- Fadrique de Toledo (1580–1622), Spanish nobleman and Admiral
- Francisco Hernández de Toledo (1514–1587), naturalist and court physician to the King of Spain
- Francisco de Toledo, Count of Oropesa (1515–1584), Spanish Viceroy of Peru
- Juan Bautista de Toledo (c.1515–1567), Spanish architect
- María de Toledo (1490–1549), Vicereine of the Spanish Colony of Santo Domingo
- Pedro Álvarez de Toledo, 2nd Marquis of Villafranca (1484–1553) Viceroy of Naples
- Pedro de Toledo, 1st Marquis of Mancera (1585–1654), Spanish Viceroy of Peru

== Contemporary ==
- Adam Toledo (2007–2021), Mexican American boy fatally shot by police
- Alejandro Toledo (b. 1946), 63rd President of Peru
- Amelia Toledo (1926–2017), Brazilian artist
- Antonio Toledo Corro (1919–2018), Mexican politician
- Ary Toledo (1937–2024), Brazilian humorist, singer, lyricist and actor
- Baldomero Toledo (b. 1970), American football (soccer) referee
- Beline Toledo (b. 2002), Mexican footballer
- Bob Toledo (b. 1946), American college football coach
- Cícero Pompeu de Toledo (1910–1959), Brazilian president of São Paulo FC
- Francisco Toledo (1940–2019), contemporary Mexican artist
- Filipe Toledo (b. 1995), Brazilian professional surfer
- Gabriel Toledo, (b. 1991), known as FalleN, Brazilian Counter-Strike player
- Goya Toledo (b. 1969), Spanish actress and model
- Guillermo Toledo (b. 1970), Spanish actor, producer and political activist
- Hernán Toledo (b. 1996), Argentinian football (soccer) player
- Isabel Toledo (1961–2019), Cuban-American fashion designer
- Javier Toledo (b. 1986), Argentinian football (soccer) player
- José Victor Toledo (1931–1980), American federal judge
- Juan Pedro Toledo (b. 1978), Mexican sprint athlete
- Klebber Toledo (b. 1986), Brazilian actor and model
- Mario Monteforte Toledo (1911–2003), Guatemalan writer and politician
- Mirta Toledo (b. 1952), Argentinian artist
- Natalia Toledo (b. 1968), Mexican poet
- Natalia Toledo (athlete) (b. 1972), Paraguayan track & field athlete
- Oliver Toledo (b. 1987), Chilean football (soccer) player
- Patchy Toledo (b. 1978), Brazilian football (soccer) player
- Rafael Toledo (b. 1980), Brazilian football (soccer) player
- Robson Toledo (b. 1981), Brazilian football (soccer) player
- Víctor Manuel Toledo (b. 1945), Mexican biologist and politician
- Will Toledo, (b. 1992), American singer/songwriter, frontman of Car Seat Headrest
