= Moise Soulam =

Sephardic author, editor, and publisher

Moïse Benjamin Soulam
- Born: 1 May 1890; Salonica, Ottoman Empire
- Died: 13 August 1967 (aged 77); Bronx, New York, US
- Resting place: Mount Hebron Cemetery, Queens, New York
- Occupations: author, editor, publisher
- Organization(s): Sephardic Brotherhood of America, Inc
- Known for: La Vara

Moïse Benjamin Soulam (1 May 1890 – 13 August 1967) was a Sephardic author, editor, and publisher of La Vara ("The Staff"), a long-running Ladino language newspaper based in New York City.

He was also President of the Sephardic Brotherhood of America, Inc. from 1917 to 1918, and again in 1922.

== Biography ==
Moïse Benjamin Soulam was born on 1 May 1890 in Salonica, Ottoman Empire, to Benjamin Soulam and Delicia Arditti. Soulam was educated in Salonica at the Alliance Israelite Universelle and the Ottoman Idadie College.

Soulam began his career as a satirical author and publisher while still living in Salonica. At the age of 18, he began his own satirical paper El Voverkeziko ("The Little Devil"). He also was on staff of another satirical paper, El Kirbach ("The Whip"), started by Moïse Levy.

Following the Balkan Wars, Salonica was annexed by Greece. This event prompted Soulam to immigrate to the United States in 1913, sailing via Le Havre, France, on the SS France. Shortly before he left, Soulam published a poem encouraging his fellow Sephardim to follow in his footsteps, fearing the anti-semitism they would face under the new Balkan governments.

Shortly after arriving in New York City, Soulam joined the staff of La America, Moise Gadol's weekly Ladino newspaper. Here, Soulam most notably began a humorous weekly advice column, "Postemas de Mujer" ("Pet Peeves of a Woman") where he wrote under a female pseudonym, Bula Satula. This popular column would follow Soulam across multiple papers and last until 1934.

In 1917, the paper, El Kirbach Amerikano ("The American Whip"), a spiritual successor to the Salonican publication, El Kirbach, was started. Sephardic journalist Albert Levy was editor and is credited by scholar Gad Nahshon as having started the paper. However, Professor Aviva Ben-Ur claims, "The 'American Whip' was in fact founded by Moïse Soulam, a former contributor to its Turkish antecedent." Regardless, the publication proved unpopular and publication ceased after seven months.

In 1922, Soulam, along with partners Albert Torres and Sam Golden, founded the Sephardic Publishing Company which would go on to publish the Ladino periodicals La Vara and El Luzero Sefaradi.

1 September 1922 saw the first issue of La Vara, a publication that would become, the longest running Ladino periodical in the US and the, "last Ladino newspaper published in Hebrew letters in the world." Albert Levy was the first editor for La Vara with Soulam initially working as the assistant editor and eventually taking over as managing editor. Additionally, Soulam continued to author articles, both satirical and serious, for the paper.

Soulam's exit from La America to La Vara prompted Gadol to personally label Soulam a "traitor" and the bad blood escalated into a "libel war" between the two papers. Nahshon attributes the protracted legal challenges resulting from this "libel war" as the cause for La America to shutter its doors in 1925.

Four years after the launch of La Vara, Soulam, Torres, and Levy continued their collaboration and started a monthly magazine, El Luzero Sefaradi ("The Sephardic Beacon"). Contrasting to the more humorous La Vara, El Luzero Sefaradi was a "quality literary magazine directed to a more educated and sophisticated audience." Unfortunately, the endeavor suffered from an insufficient subscribership and only lasted one year, folding into La Vara in September 1927.

Soulam remained with La Vara until 1934, when La Vara ceased publishing satirical content. Ben-Ur attributes this change in direction to lingering effects from the Great Depression. Other scholars, such as Ashley Rae Bobman, cite world affairs, like the rise of Hitler, as the impetus for the change. Either way, Soulam's association with the paper ended along with its humorous content.

In addition to his publishing career, Soulam was also very active in the Sephardic community in the US. In 1914, along with fellow publisher and activist Maurice Nessim, Soulam formed a Socialist Association for Sephardic immigrants, which eventually in 1918, became the Sephardi Branch of the American Socialist Party. The association was known for offering "civics classes and lectures and encouraging its members to participate in socialist political gatherings."

Soulam was also a founding member of the Sephardic Brotherhood of America, Inc., a Sephardic mutual aid and community organization, serving as its president from 1917 to 1918, and again in 1922.

== Personal life ==
Soulam married his first wife, Ester (Esterina) Nahama in Salonica before immigrating to the United States. Together, they had two children, named after Soulam's parents, Benjamin and Delicia, a.k.a. Alice. A year after Ester's death in 1929, Soulam married Regina Sustiel, a relationship that ended in divorce some time later. His marriage to his third wife, Minerva, lasted until her death in 1955.

== Death ==
Soulam passed on 13 August 1967 at the age of 77. He is buried in the Mount Hebron cemetery in Queens, New York in a plot for the Sephardic Brotherhood of America, Inc.
