= David M. Bunis =

Israeli linguist (born 1952)

- דוד מונזון בוניס
- Born: June 3, 1952 (age 73); Brooklyn, New York
- Occupation: Linguist

David Monson Bunis (Hebrew: דוד מונזון בוניס; born June 3, 1952, to Jacob and Marsha Monsohn Bunis) is a professor in the Department of Hebrew and Jewish Languages, Mandel Institute of Jewish Studies, at the Hebrew University of Jerusalem and heads its program in Judezmo (or Ladino) studies. He is also an advisor to the Israel Autoridad Nasionala del Ladino and a member of the Akademia Nasionala del Ladino. He is the editor of Languages and Literatures of Sephardic and Oriental Jews (Jerusalem, 2009), co-editor of Massorot, a Hebrew-language journal devoted to the study of Jewish language traditions, and author of books and articles on the Judezmo language and its literature.

== Career ==
After his doctoral dissertation on the Hebrew-Aramaic component of Modern Judezmo (also known as Judeo-Spanish, Ladino, Spanyol) was accepted in 1980 by the Department of Linguistics, Columbia University, David M. Bunis joined the Faculty of Humanities of the Hebrew University of Jerusalem as its Judezmo Studies specialist. In 2006 Bunis was appointed full professor in the Hebrew University's Department of Hebrew and Jewish Languages. In addition to his teaching responsibilities, Bunis supervised research projects on Judezmo language and literature supported by academic funding agencies in Israel and abroad. He participated in numerous international conferences on Judezmo and Jewish language research. Bunis has served as an advisor to the Israel Autoridad Nasionala del Ladino (National Authority for Ladino Language and Its Culture), the Israel Ministry of Education (Ladino programs), academic institutes in Israel, the United States, and Europe, and research funding agencies in Israel and abroad. He acted as academic chairman of the Misgav Yerushalayim research center (2006-2009), chairman of the Samuel Toledano Prize committee (2004), and a member of the Israel Prize in Jewish languages selection committee (2013). He is co-editor of Massorot and a member of the editorial boards of several journals devoted to linguistics and Jewish languages. In 2006 David Bunis was awarded the Yad Ben Zvi Life’s Work Prize for his pioneering contributions to Judezmo Studies. In 2013 he received the EMET Prize for the Study of Jewish Languages. In 2015 he became an Académico Correspondiente Extranjero of the Real Academia Española and in 2018 a member of the Akademia del Ladino en Israel. Bunis is a descendant of the Monsohn Family of Jerusalem and a grandson of Jerusalem-born Rabbi Menachem Mendel Monsohn.

== Selected works ==
- A Guide to Reading and Writing Judezmo, New York, The Judezmo Society, 1975, 2d ed., 1976, ISBN 0917288017 / ISBN 9780917288012.
- Sephardic Studies: A Research Bibliography, New York, Garland Press & YIVO Institute for Jewish Research, 1981 (Garland reference library of the humanities, vol. 174), ISBN 0824097599.
- A Lexicon of the Hebrew and Aramaic Elements in Modern Judezmo, Jerusalem, Magnes Press, 1993, ISBN 9652238031. With a foreword by Shelomo Morag.
- Yiddish Linguistics: A Classified Bilingual Index to Yiddish Serials and Collections, 1913-1958, (with Andrew Sunshine), New York, YIVO Institute for Jewish Research & Garland Press, 1994, ISBN 9780824097585.
- Voices from Jewish Salonika, Jerusalem, Misgav Yerushalayim, 1999, ISBN 9789652960443. (In English, Judezmo, Hebrew.)
- Judezmo: An Introduction to the Language of the Ottoman Sephardim, Jerusalem, Magnes Press, 1999, ISBN 9789654930246. (In Hebrew.)
- Languages and Literatures of Sephardic and Oriental Jews, Jerusalem, Misgav Yerushalayim & Mossad Bialik, 2009, ISBN 978-965-342-985-7.
