= List of Judaeo-Spanish language newspapers and periodicals =

The newspaper industry in Judeo-Spanish language began in the 19th century, with the newspaper Sha'arei Mizrah in the city of Smyrna in 1845. The following is a list of Ladino-language newspapers and periodicals.

== Current newspapers and periodicals ==
=== Israel ===
- Aki Yerushalayim (est. 1979)

=== Turkey ===
- Şalom (est. 1947)
- El Amaneser (est. 2005)

== Former newspapers and periodicals ==
=== Austria ===
- El Koreo de Vyena (1869 - 1884)

=== Belgium ===
- Los Muestros: La boz de los Sefardim (1990-2015)

=== Bulgaria ===
- El Amigo del Pueblo (1888-1893), first published in Belgrade, then in Sofia
- La Boz de Israel

=== Egypt ===
- El Mitsraim

=== Former Yugoslavia ===
==== Bosnia and Herzegovina ====
- La Alborada (1898–1901)
- El Koriero (1928–1933)

==== Serbia ====
===== Zemun (today part of Belgrade) =====
- El Amigo del Pueblo (1888-1892/1893), first Jewish and Ladino (Judaeo-Spanish) periodical published in Serbia, launched in Belgrade in 1888
- Hashalom (1903 - 1906)
- Luzero (1905 - )

=== Greece ===
==== Salonika ====
- El Lunar (1864-1865 - 1940)
- Salonik (1869 - 1874)
- La Epoka (1875 - 1912)
- El Luzero ()
- El Avenir (1900 - 1918)
- La Libertad (1908)
- Journal del Labourador (1909)
- El Imparcyal (1909 - 1911)
- El Kirbatch (1909 - 1911)
- El Pountchon (1909 - 1913)
- La Nasion (1909 - 1932)
- La Tribuna Libera (1910 - 1914)
- La Solidaridad Ovradera (1911)
- Avanti! (1912 - 1923)
- El Macabeo (1913 - 1929)
- La Esperansa (1915)
- El Pouevlo (1917 - 1933)
- Aksion (1919 - 1940)
- Mesagero (1935 - 1941)

=== Israel ===
- El Tiempo
- La Verdad - later changed its name to La Luz de Israel

=== Romania ===
- El Luzero de la Pasiensia (1885-1889)

=== Turkey ===
==== Istanbul ====
- El Amigo de la Familiya (1881–1886)
- Or Israel (1853–1855)
- El Jurnal Israelit (1860–1873)
- El Tyempo (1872–1930)
- El Telegrafo (1886–1930)
- El Djugeton (1908–1931)

==== Izmir ====
- Sha'arei Mizrah (1845–1846)
- La Buena Esperansa (1871 - 1912)
- Meseret (1904 - )
- El Nuvelista ( - 1922)
- La Boz del Puevlo (1908 - 1919)

=== United States ===
- La Amerika (1910 - 1923)
- La Luz (1921 - 1922)
- La Boz del Pueblo
- La Vara (1922 - 1948)
- El Mesajero
- El Ermanado
- El Luzero Sefaradi

== See also ==
- List of Jewish newspapers
- List of Yiddish newspapers and periodicals
