= El Tiempo (Istanbul) =

Judeo-Spanish (Ladino) language newspaper, published in Constantinople/Istanbul

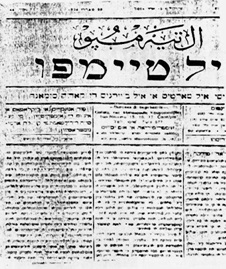
- El Tiempo cover
- Type: Daily newspaper later biweekly
- Founded: 1872
- Ceased publication: 1930
- Political alignment: Turkish reformers
- Language: Ladino
- Headquarters: Constantinople
- Country: Turkey

El Tiempo (Hebrew script: איל טיימפו) was a Ladino language newspaper published in Constantinople/Istanbul in the years 1872–1930. El Tiempo was the first Ladino newspaper published in Istanbul. It was also the longest-running Ladino newspaper in the city. It was published as a daily newspaper, later being converted into a biweekly. It soon became the most influential newspaper of its time, with a circulation of up to 10,000. From July 1882 to 1930 El Tiempo was published three times a week. Politically, the newspaper supported the positions of Turkish reformers.

At the time of the First World War, half of the adult Jews in the city were subscribers of El Tiempo. However, from that point onward the influence of the newspaper declined sharply.

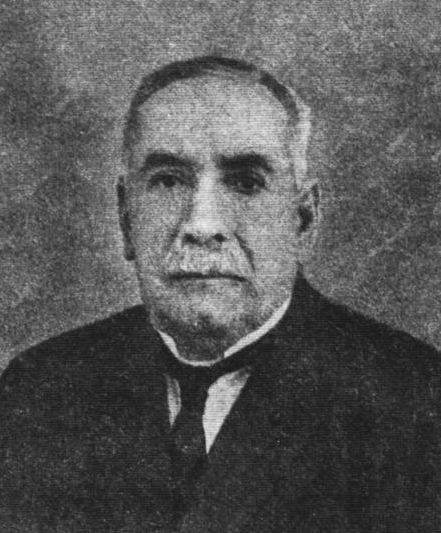
David Fresco, editor of the newspaper for almost fifty years

During the initial phase of its history the newspaper was patronized by Hayim Carmona. His son Isaac Carmona served as its editor from its founding year. After his father's death in 1883, Isaac Carmona took over as patron of the newspaper whilst the post of editor passed on to Mercado Fresco and Sami Alkabez. After a few years, David Fresco became editor. He served as editor of the newspaper for almost fifty years.

El Tiempo was supported by the Alliance Israélite Universelle. As a result, the newspaper promoted the teaching of the French language to its readers. Moreover, it sought to educate its readers in the Turkish language. It ran a section in Turkish (written in the Hebrew alphabet) every two-three days. The world-view of the paper in its early phase was largely Eurocentric, reporting events from the capitals of Europe (Paris, London, Vienna, Budapest and Berlin) whilst paying little attention to events inside the Ottoman Empire (including Constantinople/Istanbul itself). Fictional stories published in the newspaper were largely translations from French. The promotion of the French language was however somewhat subdued in the 1890s, but the language used in articles was often a heavily French-influenced Ladino.

Once Zionism emerged as a political force, El Tiempo responded by proclaiming its loyalty to the Ottoman Empire. Within the Ladino Jewish community in Constantinople/Istanbul (where Zionist ideas were beginning to take root) El Tiempo argued that Ottoman Jews ought to remain Ottoman nationals. There was a brief period (prior to 1910) during which discussions were ongoing between the World Zionist Organization and El Tiempo, but any re-evaluation of Zionism on behalf of El Tiempo was sealed as David Fresco aligned with prominent anti-Zionist Rabbi Chaim Nahum. Fresco argued in favour of assimilation of the Ottoman Jews into Turkish society and the promotion of the use of the Turkish language.

== See also ==
- List of Judaeo-Spanish language newspapers and periodicals
