= Moshe Shaul =

Israeli journalist (1929–2023)

- משה שאול
- Born: Mosheh Sha'ul; 24 May 1929; İzmir, Turkey
- Died: 1 April 2023 (aged 93); Jerusalem
- Citizenship: Israeli
- Education: Hebrew University of Jerusalem
- Occupation: Journalist
- Known for: Work on restoring Ladino
- Awards: Order of Civil Merit

Moshe Shaul (Hebrew: משה שאול; 24 May 1929 – 1 April 2023), also known as Mosheh Sha'ul, was a Turkish-born Israeli journalist, writer and researcher of the culture of Sephardi Jews whose work on preserving the Ladino language was key to its revival.

== Biography ==
Shaul was born in İzmir, Turkey on 24 May 1929. He grew up in the neighborhood around the Bet Israel Synagogue and became a member of Neemanei Tsion, a local Jewish youth organization.

In 1949, Shaul made aliyah to Israel. He settled in Kibbutz Tzuba, where his older brother Bohor was already living. During his first year of in Hebrew University, in 1954, he began working under the radio broadcaster Kol Yisrael as a Ladino presenter. He visited the homes of elderly Ladino speakers at the wish of the radio, in order to record music that was at risk of going 'extinct', ultimately saving over 400 songs. He would graduate in 1959, attaining degrees in Sociology and Political Science. That same year he would join the Ladino broadcast of La Bos de Israel, a subsidiary Kol Yisrael of based in Jerusalem, and in 1977 he would take charge of it after the death of its director, Yitzhak Levy.

Shaul served as editor for Aki Yerushalayim during their first issue which was released on 4 April 1979 and continued this role for their 37 years of operation. While working there he actively worked towards standardizing the written language by creating a phonetic writing system which eventually became adopted around the world by Ladino writers. The orthography of his system was questioned due to the absence of written accents and a structure more similar to Turkish than Romance languages.

During this period Shaul also taught at Ben-Gurion University of the Negev (1980-1985) and served in the vice-presidency of the Ladino National Authority (NALC) in Israel from 1997 to 2015, where he trained new teachers for Judeo-Spanish and expanded the prevalence of the language. His work during this period is considered responsible for much of the diffusion of the Ladino language and culture in present-day Israel. He also worked and boarded several other organizations, such as Amutat Sefarad, to promote and preserve Judeo-Spanish. Shaul stated that the internet provides an opportunity to connect Judeo-Spanish speakers globally and create a living community to help promote the language.

Shaul's orthography was made more popular through his founding of the Maale Adumim Institute, an offshoot of Amutat Sefarad and the Autoridad Nasionala del Ladino both of which he helped originally found in 1997, with Avner Perez and a beginner text book for Ladino he published in 1999.

In 2016 Shaul was appointed a permanent member of the Royal Spanish Academy for Israel. Later in 2018 he was honored with Spain's Order of Civil Merit. He also received a 'Life Award' from Autoridad Nasionala del Ladino for his contributions to the Ladino language.

Shaul died on 1 April 2023 in Jerusalem and was buried in the cemetery in Shoresh.

== Published works ==
- Ladino (Spanyolit): Sefer limmud le-matḥilim (1999). Ed: Avner Perez.
- Shaʼul, Mosheh; Quintana Rodriguez, Aldina; Ovadia, Zelda (1995). El gizado sefaradi : rechetas de komidas sefaradis de la revista kulturala djudeo-espanyola Aki Yerushalayim (in Spanish). Zaragoza: Libros Certeza. ISBN 84-96219-17-8. OCLC 61391318.
- Ladino – Manual de estudio para principiantes (1990).
