= Havilio =

Havilio is a surname. Notable people with the surname include:

- Iosi Havilio (born 1974), Argentine writer
- Laila Havilio (born 1960), Chilean sculptor
- Yosi Havilio (born 1959), Israeli lawyer and politician

== See also ==
- Havili
