= A.L. Monsohn Lithography =

Israeli publishing house

Abraham-Leib Monsohn in his fez as map-maker for the Ottomans in Jerusalem

The A.L. Monsohn Lithographic Press (Monzon Press, Monson Press, דפוס אבן א"ל מאנזאהן, דפוס מונזון) was established in Jerusalem in 1892 by Abraham-Leib (or Avrom-Leyb) Monsohn II (Jerusalem, c.1871-1930) and his brother Moshe-Mordechai (Meyshe-Mordkhe). Sponsored by members of the Hamburger family, the brothers had been sent to Frankfurt in 1890 to study lithography. Upon returning to Jerusalem in 1892 with a hand press, they established the A.L. Monsohn Lithographic Press in the Old City of Jerusalem. According to the Information Center for Israeli Art A.L. Monsohn "created complex decorations for documents and oriental calendars that combined the tradition of Jewish art with modern printing techniques such as photographic lithography, raised printing and gilding."

At first the A.L. Monsohn Press was situated in Bab al-Huta; it was later moved to the courtyard opposite what is today the Old Yishuv Court Museum (Hebrew: מוזיאון חצר היישוב הישן) at 6 Or Ha-Hayim Street in the Jewish Quarter, where Abraham-Leib Monsohn lived with his family. The press was relocated to the Mamilla section of Jerusalem, outside the Old City, and later to Yosef Ziv Street in the Tel Arza neighborhood. According to Ismar David the press eventually had facilities in Tel Aviv and Haifa as well ("About the Monson Press").

The Monsohn Press produced about 300 color prints per day, the only color printing done at the time in Jerusalem. In 1894 they imported a new machine which could print 1,000 copies a day—a great advance in local printing. The founders of the Monsohn press produced Jewish-themed color postcards, greeting cards, Jewish National Fund stamps, and maps documenting the evolution of the Jewish settlement in Eretz Israel in the nineteenth-twentieth centuries (e.g., Moses S. Klier's Mappat Eretz Yisrael Ve-Suriya, 1903; Mappat Eretz Ha-Qedosha Li-Gvuloteha, 1905); religious material such as decorative plaques for synagogues, portraits of Old Yishuv rabbis such as Shmuel Salant, Mizrah posters indicating the direction of prayer for synagogues, memorial posters, and posters for Sukkot booths; color frontispieces for books such as Pentateuch volumes and the early song collections of Abraham Zvi Idelsohn (e.g., Shire Zion, Jerusalem 1908); artistic wedding invitations; and labels, packaging and advertisements for the pioneering entrepreneurs of Eretz Israel. The texts appearing in the Monsohn products were in several languages: Hebrew, Arabic, Yiddish, English, German (e.g., a c1920 trilingual Hebrew-English-Arabic "Malaria Danger" broadside warning the public of mosquitoes spreading malaria). Many of the brilliantly colored postcards and maps can be seen online, as can the artistic invitations to his children's weddings which Monsohn published in the Jerusalem Hebrew press (e.g., that for his son Menachem Mendel Monsohn and his wife Zipporah on the front page of the 24 June 1914 issue of Moria).

The Monsohn Press received special permission from the city's rabbis to print for Christians and Moslems, so long as the material could not be used to proselytize. While Eretz Israel was under Ottoman control, Abraham-Leib Monsohn also printed the maps for the Ottoman military leader Djemal Pasha, in his headquarters in Mount Scopus.

For years, the Monsohn (later, Monson/Monzon) Press was considered the best and most innovative in the country—pioneering in such techniques as gold-embossing and offset printing, among others. Early items for tourists included collections of Flowers of the Holy Land (c. 1910–1918)—pressed local flowers accompanied by scenes from the Eretz Israel countryside and relevant verses from the Bible, edited by Jsac Chagise (or Itzhak Haggis), an immigrant from Vitebsk, and bound in carved olive wood boards. Shortly after World War I Monsohn (now spelled מונזון) used zincography to produce the prints included in the Hebrew Gannenu educational booklets for young children illustrated by Ze'ev Raban of the Bezalel Academy of Art and Design and printed in Jerusalem by Hayim Refael Hakohen (vol. 1, 1919; vols. 2–3, 1920). In 1934 Monsohn moved into the new, western part of Jerusalem, in a shop with four presses and 30 workers, including Abraham-Leib's sons, David, Yosef, Moshe and Shimon, and his daughter Raytse's husband, Abraham Barmacz. The concern did business with all sectors of the city's population, including Arabs, for whom they printed in Arabic. Among their clients were members of the Ginio, Havilio, and Elite families, and Shemen, Dubek, and other renowned national brands, manufacturing products such as wine, candies, oil, and cigarettes. They also printed movie and travel posters, and government posters, postcards and documents, hotel luggage labels, receipts for Bikur Cholim Hospital and other local institutions, metal charity boxes, Melnik, Rosin & Co. (Jerusalem) embroidery designs (c.1900), and Sabbath and Jewish holiday cloth covers for hallot. During the Tzena austerity period Monsohn was the exclusive printer of government coupon booklets.

Shimon (or S.) Monzon (sometimes spelled Monson, b. 1907; son of Abraham-Leib II) and Shimon Barmacz (b. 1922; son of Raytsa Monsohn Barmacz [b. 1901]), recipient of the Yakir Yerushalayim award), were responsible for the press in its final stage, during which it also produced Jewish National Fund calendars, posters for the government—including the fourth Independence Day (Israel) poster;—and other state agencies (e.g., Youth Aliyah), color maps, challah covers, illustrations of animals in the Bible, tourist brochures, full-color megilloth (e.g., for El-Al) In the 1950s responsibility for the press was divided between Yosef Monsohn, who continued the production of lithographic prints (followed by his son, Elyakim Monzon), and Shimon Monzon, who produced printed books and booklets, especially photo-offset editions of Hebrew sacred works, of which they printed over 80 (e.g., Mishnah Berurah, 6 vols., 1950; Miqra'ot Gedolot, 5 vols., 1955; Ḥoq Le-Yisrael, 5 vols., 1956; Shulhan Arukh, 2 vols., 1956–1957; Zohar, 5 vols., 1958–1960; Moreh Nevukhim, 3 vols., 1960). In 1955 Shimon Monson also printed the first Jerusalem edition of Vladimir Nabokov's Lolita for the Olympia Press (2 vols.). He also created the reprint of Marcus Nathan Adler's Itinerary of Benjamin of Tudela published in New York by Feldheim Publishers; and editions of scientific works such as R.G. Butenko's Plant Tissue Culture and Plant Morphogenesis, published in Jerusalem, 1968 as part of the Israel Program for Scientific Translations. The revolutionary Koren Publishers Jerusalem Bible was printed at the press of Shimon Monzon (Pentateuch, 1959; complete Bible, 1965 and later printings). Unable to compete with larger, more modernized concerns, the Monsohn/Monzon Press closed in 1992. A grandson of the founders helped establish Keter Press, printer of the first edition of the Encyclopedia Judaica and still one of Israel's leading printing establishments. Shimon Barmacz's son, Mordechai (b. 1948), established the Hebron Press in Kiryat Arba. Elyakim Monzon (b. 1927), son of Abraham-Leib's son Yosef (b. 1903), also engaged in printing. Moshe Monzon (b. 1958), grandson of Abraham-Leib's son Moshe, produces artistic tapestries. The prints produced by the A.L. Monsohn Lithography and S. Monzon Press are today sought by collectors the world over.
