= Hashalom =

- Editor: Isaac Mitrani
- Founded: 1903
- Ceased publication: 1906
- Language: Judaeo-Spanish
- Headquarters: Belgrade
- Country: Serbia

Hashalom (Peace) was a Sephardic journal published in Belgrade from 1903 until 1906. The number of pages differed from 8 to 24 and the format was 15×23 cm.

== History and content ==
The editor was Isaac Mitrani, articles were written in Judeo-Spanish in Rashi letters, and it basically brought "national news, Jewish history, religious education, very interesting stories" (novedades nasyonales, istorya de los đudeos, sensya reližyoza, kuentos muy kuryozos), as stated on the cover page. The magazine was decidedly Zionist-oriented, called for Jewish unity and the creation of a Jewish state. News usually concerned the persecution of Jews in Europe and appeals for help. Literary texts described themes from history or prominent persons from that time. The magazine did not have a precise publishing schedule, but depended on subscription payments. For example, the second issue of the third year was published at the beginning of spring 1906, on Purim, and the third one not before the beginning of summer of that year. At the end of that issue, the editorial board wrote an apology (Eskuza) in which they asked for understanding for the delay and informed their audience that timely subscription payments would enable bi-monthly publishing.

Although the magazine was printed in Belgrade, the editorial board moved from one city to another. It shows how the state boundaries did not represent any kind of obstacle and that the circulation of Jews among their communities throughout the Balkans went undisturbed. The editor of the second issue in the third year was Isaac Mitrani from Belgrade, while the editor of the third number of the same year was his relative Barouh Mitrani from Sofia.

== Donations ==
In one of the articles, the editorial board acknowledges the receipt of donations and appeals to readers to donate. It proves that the destiny of the magazine depended solely on its readers. This text also evinces that the magazine was read throughout the Balkan Peninsula:

To our friends in Belgrade! We thank you for your promises: the anonymous reader who helped us with the costs of this number! We praise him from the depth of our heart, hoping the others would do the same! Friends in Sofia and Filipolje, we wait for your good promises: to our subscribers in Pazardzhik, Niš, Vidin, Yambol, Varna, Kragujevac, Dupnica, thank you for continuation of your favors to enable us continue: subscribers in Sarajevo and Šabac, we thank you as well (Hashalom III, 2: 16).

== See also ==
- List of Judaeo-Spanish language newspapers and periodicals
