= La Buena Esperanza =

Weekly newspaper in the Ottoman Empire (1871–1912)

- Founder: Aron de Yosef Hazan
- Editor: Aron de Yosef Hazan
- Founded: 1871
- Ceased publication: 1912
- Language: Ladino
- Headquarters: İzmir
- Country: Ottoman Empire

La Buena Esperanza ([la ˈbweːna espeˈrantsa], Ladino: The Good Hope) was a Ladino language weekly newspaper which was published in Smyrna, Ottoman Empire, in the period 1871–1912, being the longest-run Ladino newspaper in the city.

== History and profile ==
La Buena Esperanza was launched in Smyrna in 1871. The founder and editor of the paper which was published on a weekly basis was Aron de Yosef Hazan. He was an Italian-origin Jewish who was working as a teacher at the Alliance Israélite Universelle school in Smyrna. He closed down La Buena Esperanza in 1912 when he had to leave the city because of the invasion of Tripoli by the Italian Empire.

== See also ==
- List of Judaeo-Spanish language newspapers and periodicals
