= Le Journal de Salonique =

French newspaper in the Ottoman Empire (1895–1911)

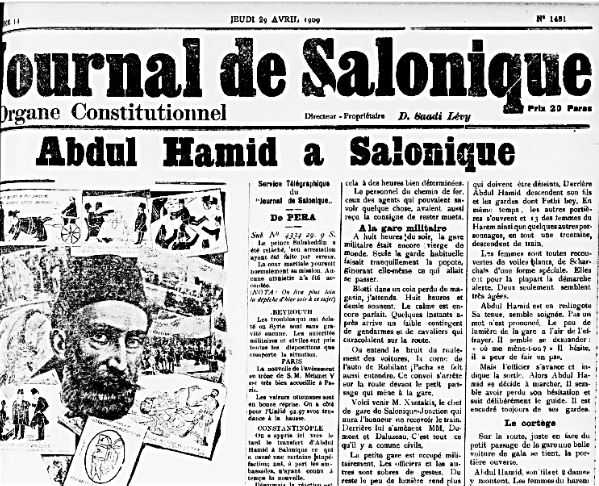
- Cover page of Le Journal de Salonique date 29 April 1909
- Type: Biweekly newspaper
- Founder(s): Sadi Levy
- Publisher: Sadi Levy; Samuel Levy
- Editor: Vitalis Cohen; Samuel Levy
- Founded: 7 November 1895
- Language: French
- Ceased publication: 1911
- Headquarters: Thessaloniki
- Country: Ottoman Empire
- Sister newspapers: La Epoca
- OCLC number: 829692359

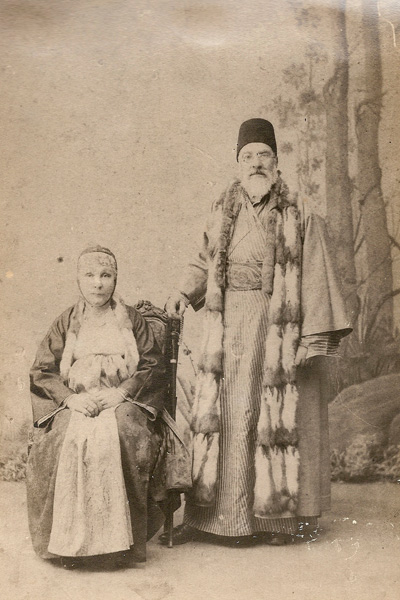
Sadi Levi, founder of Le Journal de Salonique

Le Journal de Salonique was a biweekly newspaper published between 1895 and 1911 in Thessaloniki, Ottoman Empire. It was the longest running French newspaper published in the city.

== History and profile ==
Le Journal de Salonique was launched by Sadi Levy in Thessaloniki in 1895, and its first issue appeared on 7 November 1895. He was also founder and publisher of La Epoca, a Ladino newspaper. In the first issue Le Journal de Salonique stated its goal as to improve the region. The paper came out biweekly. It conveyed news related to all ethnic and religious groups living in the city, and its title page contained Gregorian, Julian, and Hijri dates, but not the Hebrew calendar. Because although its founder and publisher was a Jew, it did not describe itself as a Jewish newspaper during the early period. The paper serialized novels mostly written by French authors. The work by only three non-French novelists, Greek Kostis Palamas, Polish Henryk Sienkiewicz, and Austrian Leopold von Sacher-Masoch, was published in the paper.

The editor-in-chief of the paper was first Vitalis Cohen who was succeeded by Samuel Levy, a son of Sadi Levy. Le Journal de Salonique managed to have nearly 1,000 subscribers. The paper and its sister publication La Epoca both folded in 1911.
