= El Amaneser =

Ladino newspaper in Istanbul

El Amaneser (Ladino: איל אמאניסיר, lit. 'The Dawn') is a Ladino or Judaeo-Spanish monthly newspaper published in Istanbul.

== History ==
Historically, Şalom, the Jewish weekly newspaper in Turkey was written exclusively in Ladino, but in 1984 it switched to Turkish, except one page in Ladino a week. In 2003, El Amaneser was established as an all Ladino monthly supplement to Şalom, making it the only Ladino newspaper in the world. El Amaneser is managed by the non profit Turkish Ottoman Sephardic Research Center in the same building as Şalom. It has a circulation of 6,000 readers.

== See also ==
- Aki Yerushalayim, an Israeli magazine in Judaeo-Spanish published 2–3 times a year in Jerusalem
- List of Judaeo-Spanish language newspapers and periodicals

== External ==
- Official website (English)
- Official website (Ladino)
