= Joseph Nehama =

Jewish educator and historian

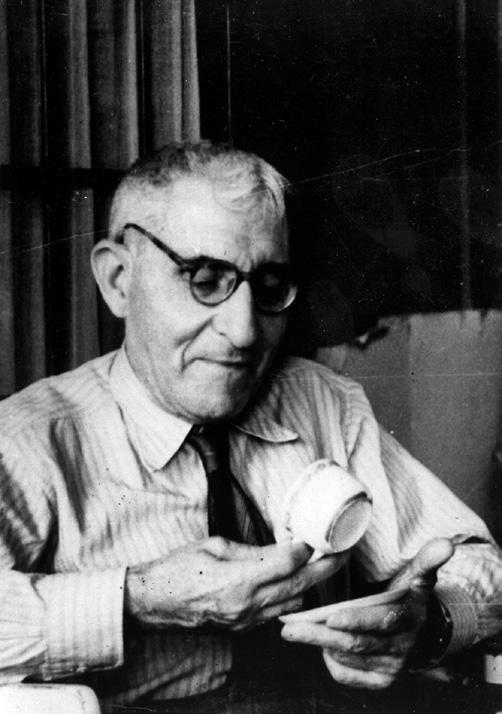

Personal life
- Born: March 17, 1881 Salonika, Ottoman Empire
- Died: October 29, 1971 (aged 90)
- Education: Alliance Israélite Universelle
- Occupation: Banker

Religious life
- Religion: Judaism

Joseph Nehama (March 17, 1881 – October 29, 1971) was a Jewish educator and historian from Salonika. He worked as a banker and survived the Holocaust by fleeing to Athens. After the war, he became an advocate for Zionism.

== Biography ==
Nehama was born on March 17, 1881, in Salonika, Ottoman Empire. He was a relative of the reform rabbi Judah Nehama, and studied at the Ecole Normale Orientale, the teacher training school of the Alliance Israélite Universelle in Paris. In his capacity as teacher and school principal of the local Alliance Israélite Universelle, Nehama devoted his life to educating several generations of Salonikan youth. Along with being a teacher, he wrote about the histories of the Salonika Jewish Community, ultimately publishing a seven volume set in 1913 through France. He published under the pseudonym 'Pepo Risal'.

As a writer, Nehama would become noteworthy not only for his histories of the diaspora community, but for his work on Judaeo-Spanish. He would create and publish a comprehensive Judaeo-Spanish to French dictionary. His dictionary, seen as more of an encyclopedia due to its extensiveness, would be instrumental in standardizing the language.

Nehama would become a local community leader for the non-Zionist faction. He was a key community leader in the 1930s who encouraged Jews to stay in Salonika and not immigrate to British Palestine. He would be identified as a Maskilim leader due to these positions and advocacy.

During World War I when British and French troops entered Thessaloniki, Nehama would intervene on behalf of Avanti, a local newspaper that had opposed Greek entry into the war, which had been shuttered by government orders. He successfully got the newspaper to regain publication rights due to connections he had with the French Military.

Alongside his activities as an educator, Nehama was also a businessman. He founded the Union Bank of Salonika with his brother Albert in 1926.

During the Holocaust, Nehama managed to escape the Nazis in Salonika by fleeing to Athens. However he was caught by them and deported on March 25, 1944, to Bergen-Belsen Concentration Camp. He was liberated by the American army in the last days of World War II.

After his liberation from Bergen-Belsen, Nehama was devastated by the destruction of the Salonika Jewish community. He felt personally responsible due to his previous stance against leaving Salonika for the land of Israel. He channeled these energies towards Zionist advocacy and recording the destruction of the Greek Jewish community.

Nehama died on October 29, 1971.
