= Monsohn Family of Jerusalem =

Prominent Jewish family of Jerusalem

Yoel Yosef Shimon ("Shimen Shames") Monsohn and family in Jerusalem 1905
- Yoel Yosef Shimon ("Shimen Shames") Monsohn, wife Gittel, daughter Chayke, granddaughter Bashke
- Spouse: Gittel (Yofe) Monsohn
- Children: Abraham-Leib, Aharon Yitzchak, Zisul, Moshe-Mordechai, Chaya (Chayke), Miriam (Mirke), Rachel Ginendel (HaKohen)

Abraham-Leib ben Yitshak Monsohn (Hebrew: ר' אברהם-לייב ב' יצחק מאנזאהן/מונזון), known as "Avrom-Leib Shames" (1804–1870), was a member of the first Ashkenazi prayer quorum of Perushim in the Old Yishuv community of Jerusalem at the beginning of the nineteenth century. He was born in Mogilev, and according to family legend, made his way to Jerusalem on horseback in 1832 with other students of the Vilna Gaon. His first wife was Zelda; he later married Dahde, believed to have been of the Maghrebim or North African Jewish community of Hebron (or maybe the references are to the same woman, using different names). Abraham-Leib was the first beadle and caretaker (shamash) of the Menachem Zion and Rabbi Yehudah He-Hasid (Hurva) synagogues in the Old City of Jerusalem, and of Rachel's Tomb on the outskirts of Bethlehem. He was also an aid to community leader Shlomo Zalman Zoref and in 1836 accompanied him to Egypt to obtain the permission of Muhammad Ali to build the Hurva synagogue.

== Descendants ==
Abraham-Leib's son, Yoel Yosef Shimon Monsohn (Jerusalem, c.1843-c.1907), called "Shimen Shames," later assumed the communal tasks his father had performed, by commission of Sir Moses Montefiore. He was in contact with communal leaders of the time such as Yosef Yoel Rivlin, and in fact with all the Russian Jews of the Old Yishuv, since he distributed the Jewish mail for the Russian post office in Jerusalem. Shimen Shames was married to Gittel (née Yofe), whose family migrated to Hebron with fellow members of the Chabad hasidic movement in Shklov in the 1820s. Members of the Monsohn family also intermarried with other Old Yishuv families such as descendants of the Schwartz, Honig and Getz Hacohen families.

Shimen Shames' son, Abraham-Leib II (Jerusalem, c.1871-1930), together with his brother Moshe-Mordechai (Jerusalem, c.1870-1940), were sent to Frankfurt in 1890 to study lithographic printing. Upon returning to Jerusalem with a hand press, they established the A.L. Monsohn Lithography in the Old City of Jerusalem, in the courtyard opposite what is today the Isaac Kaplan Old Yishuv Court Museum (Hebrew: מוזיאון חצר היישוב הישן), where Abraham-Leib resided with his wife Rachel-Leah Miriam, a descendant of the Old Yishuv Honig family. The press produced about 300 color prints per day, the only color printing done at the time in Jerusalem. The press closed in 1992.

Descendants of Abraham-Leib II and Moshe-Mordechai Monsohn engaged in rabbinics, public service, printing, and the arts and sciences. Under Shimon Monzon (b. 1907; son of Abraham-Leib II) and Shimon Barmacz (b. 1922; son of Abraham-Leib II's daughter, Raytsa Monsohn Barmacz [b. 1901]; recipient of the Yakir Yerushalayim award), the Monzon Press flourished until it closed in 1992. The Koren Publishers Jerusalem Bible was printed at the press of Shimon Monzon in 1965. Shimon Barmacz and his son, Mordechai (b. 1948), established the Hebron Press in Kiryat Arba. Roey Schneider (b. 1994), Raytsa Monsohn Barmacz's great grandson, was an award-winning Israeli poet. Abraham-Leib II's son Yosef (Yosl, b. 1903) and his son Elyakim Monzon (b. 1927) also engaged in printing. Elyakim's granddaughter, Shir Monzon (b. 1998), was a popular Israeli singer (Shir z"l was tragically killed in a military accident). Hagit Avnon-Klein, daughter of Yosef Monsohn's daughter Kayla Ofra Avnon, was an actress and singer; appearing in the New York vicinity with her husband Zvi Klein (pianist), son Dvir Avnon-Klein (violinist) and daughter Hillit Avnon-Klein (flutist), Hagit sang and recounted the history of the Monsohn Family from Mogilev to Jerusalem. Zvi Talmon (b. 1922), son of Abraham-Leib II's son David (b. 1893), received a doctorate in Hebrew Language from the Hebrew University of Jerusalem and was a noted Israeli ḥazzan, composer and conductor. Moshe Monzon (b. 1958), grandson of Abraham-Leib II's son Moshe Monsohn (b. 1897), created artistic tapestries and lithographs and ran an art gallery in the Cardo of the Old City of Jerusalem. Emily Amrussi (b. 1979), Moshe Monsohn's great granddaughter, was a journalist and political activist. Arthur Schwartz, grandson of Abraham-Leib II's son Menachem Mendel Monsohn, received an M.Sci. in Mechanical Engineering from CUNY. Menachem Mendel's grandson Henry Aronson was a composer and musical director in the Broadway Theater. Menachem Mendel's grandson Jesse Aronson was an Executive Technology Director at Synectics, Mclean, Virginia. David M. Aronson, Menachem Mendel's great grandson, was a Steadicam operator, DP, and video engineer in Washington, DC. who shot for Networks like NBC, ESPN, Al Jazeera, and PBS. David M. Bunis, Menachem Mendel's great grandson, received a doctorate in Linguistics from Columbia University and was a professor of Ladino and Jewish Languages at the Hebrew University of Jerusalem. Menachem Mendel's grandson Martin M. Bunis received an M.A. in Guidance and Counselling from New York University and was an award-winning SSA investigator. Or Bunis (/Mahapatra Moksha. b. 1984), Menachem Mendel's great granddaughter, received a B.A. from the Jerusalem Academy of Music and Dance and was an Israeli musician and mantra performer. Menachem Mendel's great grandson Ivri Bunis (b. 1983) received a doctorate in Hebrew and Aramaic from the Hebrew University of Jerusalem; his great grandson Hallel Bunis (b. 1987) received a doctorate in Mechanical Engineering from the Technion; and his great grandson Paz Bunis (b. 1990) received an M.A. in Computer Science from the Hebrew University of Jerusalem and worked at Mobileye in Jerusalem. Dina Zingler (b. 1902), daughter of Moshe-Mordechai Monsohn (b. 1902), travelled with her father to Beirut to study hat-making and ran a successful millinery shop in the center of Jerusalem. Rabbi Shimon Ben Shemen (b. 1905), son of Moshe-Mordechai Monsohn, was a Hebrew educator who published diverse educational works (e.g., Hebrew translation of Talmud Bavli, Ta'anit, Haifa 1966; Megilla, Haifa 1967; Ḥagiga, Haifa 1968; Mo'ed Qatan, Haifa 1968; Bava Qama, Jerusalem 1971; Bava Metzia, [Tel Aviv] 1978; Bava Batra, Haifa 1982, 2 vols.; Millon Arami-'Ivri, Bene Beraq 1999).

Rabbi Menachem Mendel Monsohn (Jerusalem, 1895; New York, 1953), a son of Abraham-Leib II, immigrated to the United States in 1924 and published several editions of Mi-Peninei Ha-Rambam: Bi'ur 'al ha-Torah, a compendium of Maimonides' commentaries on the Pentateuch, arranged by the compiler in order of the Torah chapters, in New York in the 1930s. His eldest son, Samuel Stanford Manson (1919–2013) was an acclaimed metals researcher for NASA; in the 1950s and 1960s he helped elaborate the Manson-Coffin Law of metal fatigue and the Manson-Hirschberg Method of Universal Slopes, findings which were crucial to space engines and heat shields. In 1966 he published Thermal Stress and Low-cycle Fatigue.

The early generations of the Jerusalem Monsohn's are buried in the ancient Jewish cemetery on the Mount of Olives. Most of their descendants still reside in Israel. Members of the family still possess the secret key to Rachel's Tomb commissioned by Sir Moses Montefiore.
