= Aki Yerushalayim =

- Founder: Moshe Shaul
- Editor-in-chief: Aldo Sevi
- Deputy editor: Nava Cohen, Esther Rute-Cediel
- Founded: April 4, 1979
- Language: Judeo-Spanish
- Sister newspapers: Salom
- ISSN: 0793-1166
- Website: https://yerushalayimaki.wixsite.com/ladino

Aki Yerushalayim (Ladino pronunciation: [aˈki jeɾuʃaˈlajim]; meaning 'Here Jerusalem') is an Israeli magazine in Judaeo-Spanish (Ladino) published in print two to three times a year between 1979 and 2016, and exclusively online since 2019.

== History ==
Aki Yerushalayim began released its first issue on April 4, 1979. It was the main periodical published in Judeo-Spanish, published alongside the Turkish newspaper Şalom. The aim of Aki Yerushalayim was to ensure the preservation and diffusion of Ladino and Sephardic culture. The magazine was jointly published by the Sefarad Association and the Autoridad Nasionala del Ladino, the Ladino regulator.

Its director from 1979 until his passing in 2023 was Moshe Shaul, who had served as an editor since the first issue until 2020. The magazine had an online edition as well, which continued in 2019 after the magazine ceased to operate with a print edition in 2016. It was found that during the COVID-19 pandemic, online readership increased significantly as interest in Ladino was revived.

== See also ==
- El Amaneser, a Turkish monthly newspaper in Judaeo-Spanish published in Istanbul
- List of Judaeo-Spanish language newspapers and periodicals
