= La Epoca (Ladino newspaper) =

Ladino newspaper in the Ottoman Empire (1875–1911)

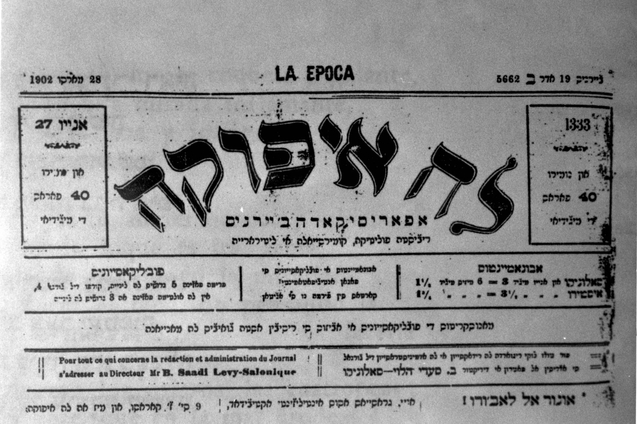
- Cover page dated 1902
- Type: Daily newspaper; Weekly newspaper
- Founder: Saadi Levy
- Publisher: Saadi Levy; Samuel Levy
- Editor: Saadi Levy; Samuel Levy
- Founded: 1 November 1875
- Ceased publication: 1911
- Political alignment: Zionism; Socialism; Ottomanism
- Language: Ladino
- Headquarters: Thessaloniki
- Country: Ottoman Empire
- Sister newspapers: Le Journal de Salonique

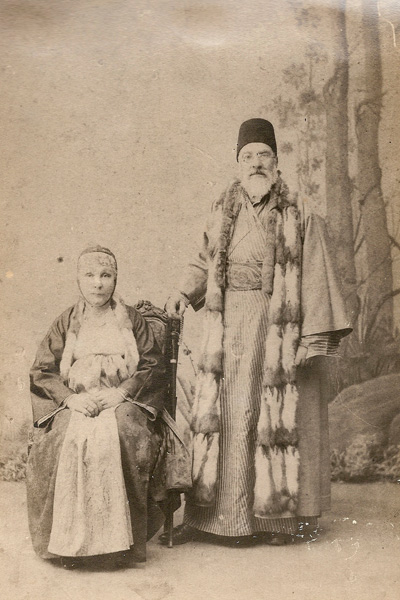
Saadi Levy and his second wife, Esther Florentin

La Epoca (Ladino: The Era) was a Ladino language newspaper published between 1875 and 1911 in Thessaloniki, Ottoman Empire. Published nearly for forty years it was the leading Ladino publication in the Empire and first Ladino newspaper in Thessaloniki.

== History and profile ==
La Epoca was launched by Saadi Levy in 1875, and the first issue appeared on 1 November that year. He also served as the publisher and editor-in-chief of the paper until 1888. He was the publisher of another paper entitled Le Journal de Salonique, a French language newspaper. The subtitle of La Epoca was Revista comerciala y literaria (Ladino: Commercial and literary newspaper), and the paper had a progressive and avant-garde stance. Its supporter was Alliance Israélite Universelle, a Jewish organization. La Epoca targeted the Sephardi Jews living in Thessaloniki and other towns who could only read Ladino materials.

Following the death of Saadi Levy his son, Samuel, became the editor and publisher of La Epoca. The newspaper was first published on a daily basis, and then, its frequency was switched to weekly. One of the contributors was Mercado Joseph Covo. La Epoca and its sister newspaper Le Journal de Salonique both supported Zionism, socialism and Ottomanism. In 1892 La Epoca praised the Ottomans for offering them a land after their expulsion from Spain and described the Empire as the "land where we are eating free bread." Following the Young Turk revolution in 1908 both La Epoca and Le Journal de Salonique focused more on Zionism.

La Epoca folded in 1911. The paper was archived by the National Library of Israel.

== See also ==
- List of Judaeo-Spanish language newspapers and periodicals
