= Şalom =

Jewish newspaper in Turkey

- Type: Weekly newspaper
- Format: Tabloid
- Owner: Gözlem Gazetecilik Basın ve Yayın A.Ş.
- Publisher: İvo Molinas
- Editor: Yakup Barokas
- Founded: 29 October 1947
- Political alignment: Neutral
- Language: Turkish and Ladino (print and online edition); English (online edition)
- Headquarters: Atiye Sokak, Polar Apt. No 12/6, 30204 Teşvikiye, Istanbul, Turkey
- Circulation: 5,000 weekly
- Price: TL 2.30 Weekly, TL 120 Yearly subscription (2009)
- Website: Şalom official website

Şalom is a Jewish weekly newspaper published in Turkey. Its name is the Turkish spelling of the Hebrew word שלום (Shalom). It was established on 29 October 1947 by the Turkish Jewish journalist Avram Leyon. It is printed in Istanbul and is published every Wednesday. Apart from one Ladino (Judaeo-Spanish) page, it is published in Turkish. From 1947 to 1984, the newspaper was published exclusively in Ladino. However, due to the massive decline of Ladino and the language shift to Turkish in the Turkish Jewish community over the decades, the newspaper switched to Turkish and the Ladino content was reduced to one page in 1984. İvo Molinas is its publisher, and Yakup Barokas is its editor-in-chief. Its circulation is about 5,000.

As of 2023 the Ladino supplement is the sole Ladino monthly newspaper in the world.

== See also ==
- El Amaneser, a Turkish monthly newspaper in Ladino affiliated to Şalom and published in Istanbul
- Aki Yerushalayim, a Ladino-language Israeli magazine published 2–3 times a year in Jerusalem
- List of Judaeo-Spanish language newspapers and periodicals
