= Judy Frankel =

American singer (1943 - 2008)

Background information
- Born: 1943; Boston, Massachusetts, U.S.
- Died: March 20, 2008 San Francisco, California
- Spouse: Ken Frankel

Judy Frankel (1943 - March 20, 2008, San Francisco) was an American singer of Judaeo-Spanish, Yiddish, and Hebrew music.

== Biography ==
Judy Frankel was born as Judith Bradbury in Boston, the only child of Ashkenazi parents. By age 13 she was already singing and playing guitar at weddings, bar mitzvahs, and on radio and television.

She graduated from Boston University. During her time at college, Frankel won a singing contest, which came with a recording contract and a tour, but her parents insisted she finish her degree before embarking on a music career.

== Career ==
After graduating college, Frankel first worked as an elementary school teacher.

In the 1960s, she lived in Hawaii. She arrived in San Francisco in 1969 with her then husband, Ken Frankel, and she sang as a soloist in the San Francisco Symphony Chorus and San Francisco Consort, a medieval music band.

In the 1980s, Frankel developed an interest in Sephardic culture and music after performing for a Ladino-speaking senior patient at Mount Zion Medical Center. She subsequently learned a number of Ladino songs, and embarked on research trips to Europe and Israel to study Ladino music and crypto-Jewish culture. In 1989, she visited Portugal to interview families of crypto-Jewish descent. She also volunteered with Americans of crypto-Jewish heritage, helping them reconnect to Jewish culture and community.

Frankel's singing was included on the soundtrack of the 1989 documentary Trees Cry for Rain, by filmmaker Bonnie Burt.

Frankel performed in a number of countries, including Spain, Cuba, Canada, France, and China. When she was in Macau, she learned a pacifist song from a refugee from East Timor. In 1995, she sang said song in Lisbon as a homage to Aristides de Sousa Mendes, a Portuguese diplomat who, when working in Bordeaux, saved the life of thousands of Jews by giving them visas to escape from Nazi-occupied France.

In 1997, Frankel was included in Rounder Records' "Divine Divas: A World of Women's Voices".

== Personal life ==
Frankel was diagnosed with breast cancer in the 1990s, but underwent successful treatment and went into remission.

Frankel died from cancer in 2008, in San Francisco.

== Works ==
- Sephardic songs in Judaeo-Spanish

== Discography ==
- Sephardic Songs of Love and Hope (1992)
- Scalerica de Oro (1995)
- Silver & Gold (1997)
- Tresoros Sefardis (1998)
