= Havili =

Havili is a surname. Notable people with the surname include:

- Aisea Havili (born 1977), Tongan rugby union player
- David Havili (born 1994), New Zealand rugby union player
- Onehunga Havili (born 1996), Tongan rugby union player
- Siliva Havili (born 1993), New Zealand & Tonga international rugby league footballer
- Silo Havili (born 1963), Tongan boxer
- Stanley Havili (born 1987), American football player
