= La America =

Former Judeo-Spanish (Ladino) language weekly newspaper

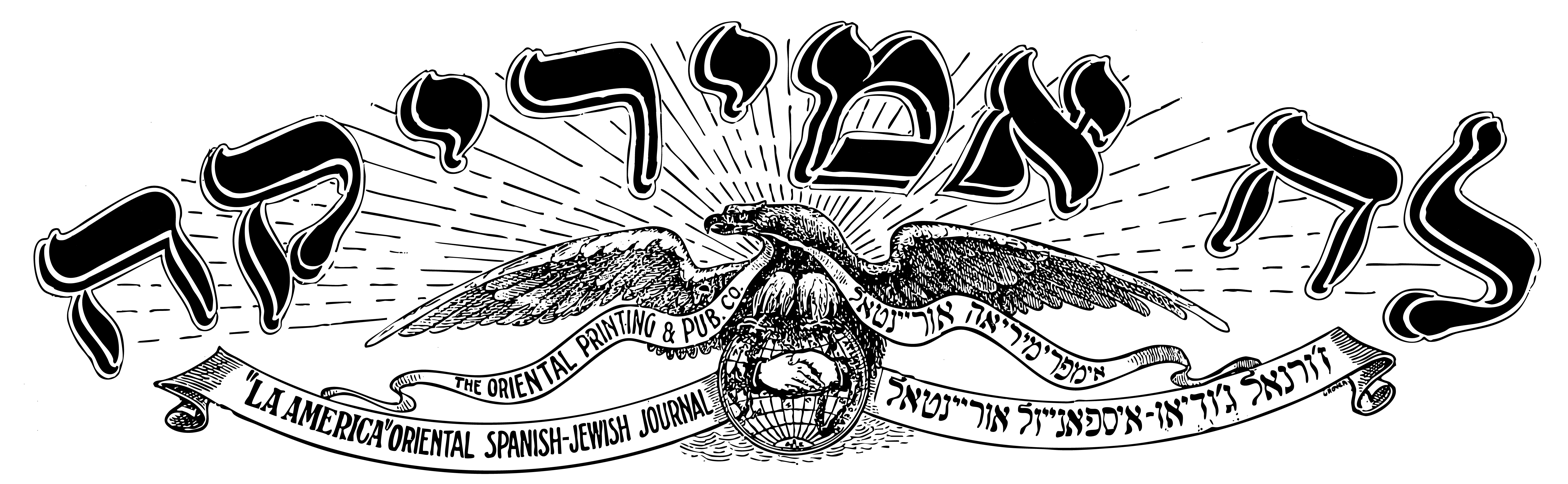
- Type: weekly newspaper
- Editor: Moise S. Gadol
- Founded: 1910
- Ceased publication: 1925
- Political alignment: Sephardi Jew
- Language: Ladino
- Headquarters: New York City
- Country: United States

La America was a Judeo-Spanish (Ladino) language weekly newspaper, published 1910–1925 in New York City, as a national Sephardi Jewish newspaper in the United States. It was edited by Moise S. Gadol, an immigrant from Rostchuck, Bulgaria. Gadol's aim was to unite his readers for social and cultural purposes – "an uphill battle at best".

Marc D. Angel counts it as one of the two most important such publications historically, the other being La Vara.
