= Laila Havilio =

Chilean artist

Laila Havilio (born 1960) is a sculptor from Santiago, Chile.

She is a Chilean sculptor working in wood, stone, bronze, cement, and ceramic. Born in Recoleta, Chile in April 1960, she moved to Buenos Aires Argentina at the age of 10. From 1980 to 1983 she studied ceramics with the sculptor Ingeborg Ringer. In 1993 she moved to Paris, France to continue her formal education in sculpting of high-temperature ceramics under sculptor Vivianne Cheveron. In 1995 she moved back to Chile where she attended the Pontifical Catholic University of Chile to learn working in other media including wood and stone. At the same time, she became an apprentice at "La Obra", a prestigious metal sculpture foundry. There she learned the Lost-wax casting method and was able to produce sculptures in bronze and other metals. In 2001 Havilio exhibited at the Galeria de arte San Francisco in Chile, thus making a name for herself. Two years later, in 2003, Havilio was selected by the Inter-American Development Bank, (IDB), in Washington DC to represent Chile in their art collection. Meanwhile, other sculptures by the artist were displayed at the Embassy of Chile in Washington, D.C. Since then, Havilio has had frequent coverage of her work in Chilean newspapers, television and radio.

== Sculptures ==
- A la Deriva
- Alef
- Angel
- Big-Bang
- Buque
- Ciclum Das Cobri
- En Equilibrio
