= Autoridad Nasionala del Ladino =

Israeli government organisation to preserve Ladino

Autoridad Nasionala del Ladino (Ladino pronunciation: [autoɾiˈdað nasjoˈnala del laˈdino], "National Authority of Ladino") is a national Israeli organisation created in 1997 with the goal of preserving and safeguarding Judaeo-Spanish, commonly known as Ladino.

The authority was established in the wake of a law passed by the Knesset on 3 March 1996. It publishes the Ladino magazine Aki Yerushalayim for the Sephardi community in Israel and the diaspora. The first chairman of the board was the fifth president of Israel, Yitzhak Navon. The vice-president and editor-in-chief of Aki Yerushalayim is Moshe Shaul.

A successor organisation was announced in agreement with the Association of Spanish Language Academies in 2017, and created the following year as Akademia Nasionala del Ladino

== Objectives ==
- Propagate the knowledge and awareness of the Judeo-Spanish culture
- Helping founding and enriching active Judeo-Spanish cultural institutions
- Promoting, encouraging and helping the gathering, documentation and cataloging Judeo-Spanish literature.
- Publishing books by contemporary authors who write about Judeo-Spanish topics, either in their original language or Hebrew.
- Organising and promoting activities that can disseminate information about Sephardic communities exterminated in the Holocaust

== See also ==
- Cuisine of the Sephardic Jews
- Academy of the Hebrew Language, a language regulator for Hebrew
- YIVO, a language regulator for Yiddish
