= Menachem Mendel Monsohn =

Personality

- Mendel and Zipporah Monsohn
- Born: October 13, 1895; Jerusalem, Ottoman Syria
- Died: September 3, 1953 (aged 57); Brooklyn, New York
- Occupation: Rabbi
- Spouse: Zipporah Yehudit (Silberman) Monsohn
- Children: Esther (Schwartz), Shmuel [Samuel Stanford] Manson, Shimon [Simon] Manson, Chaya Masha Gittel [Marsha] (Bunis), Raytse [Rose] (Aronson)

Rabbi Menachem Mendel Monsohn (Hebrew: מנחם מענדל מאנזאהן; October 13, 1895 – September 3, 1953) was a member of the Monsohn family of Jerusalem, born in the Old City of Jerusalem. He was a great-grandson of Abraham-Leib Monsohn, one of the founders of the Ashkenazi Old Yishuv of Jerusalem in the early nineteenth century, and a son of Abraham-Leib Monsohn II, a founder of the A.L. Monsohn Lithography in Jerusalem. After marrying, Monsohn lived with his family in the Batei Broide section of Nachlaot, Jerusalem, which provided housing for rabbis and their families. In 1924 Monsohn immigrated to the United States with a group of rabbis from Eretz Israel, settling in Brooklyn, New York, where he served as rabbi of Congregation Ezrath Israel on Gates Avenue, in the Bedford-Stuyvesant section, until his death in 1953. His book, Mi-Peninei Ha-Rambam: Bi’ur ‘al ha-Torah, a compendium of Maimonides’ commentaries on the Pentateuch, arranged by the compiler in order of the Torah chapters, first appeared in Brooklyn c.1925 and was reprinted there several times in the early 1930s. In 2006 it was re-released by Mossad Harav Kook of Jerusalem, which also published an English translation, Pearls of the Rambam (tr. Avraham Berkovits) c. 2008. Some of the early editions included a Yiddish introduction to the life of Maimonides.

== Expanded description ==
Monsohn’s intellectual prowess became apparent at an early age: at 16 he received rabbinical ordination (semikhah) from Rabbi Abraham Isaac Kook, the first Ashkenazic chief rabbi of British Mandatory Palestine; diverging from his usual practice, Rabbi Kook gave Monsohn an approbation to be published in his Mi-Peninei Ha-Rambam. To earn a living, for a while Monsohn worked at the lithographic press established in Jerusalem by his father and uncle. But he objected to the press's printing of a calendar for one of the Jerusalem churches and he quit the press. After establishing himself as a rabbi in Brooklyn, New York, Monsohn brought his wife, Zipporah Yehudit (Chipe, née Silberman, a descendant of Yitschak Shatz/Schwartz and Baruch-Mordechai Schwartz, who immigrated to Jerusalem from Nesvizh in the early 19th century) and their Jerusalem-born children, Eshke (Esther Schwartz, wife of Max Schwartz), Shmuel (Samuel Stanford Manson), Shimon (Simon Manson), and Chaya Masha Gitl (Marsha Bunis, wife of Jacob Bunis) to Brooklyn; their daughter Raytse (Rose Aronson, wife of Matthew Aronson) was born there. In Brooklyn, Monsohn eked out a living, devoting most of his time to work on his Mi-Penine Ha-Rambam, which he printed himself, using the skills acquired at his father’s press. In all editions of his book—published in Hebrew (as מפניני הרמב"ם) in Brooklyn, New York in 1932, 1934, 1936, 1937, 1939 and in Jerusalem in 2006, and in English (as Pearls of the Rambam) in Jerusalem, 2008—Monsohn noted that he was born in Jerusalem.
