= La Vara =

Weekly Newspaper

La Vara (English: The Stick) was a Judeo-Spanish (Ladino) language weekly newspaper, published 1922–1948 in New York City, as a national Sephardi Jewish newspaper in the United States. It was edited by Albert Levy, a Salonican Jew, and had a circulation of 16,500 in 1928. Marc D. Angel counts it as one of the two most important such publications historically, the other being La America.

La Vara introduced an English-language section in 1934.
