= Endecha =

The endecha (often used in the plural endechas) is a subgenre of lament, planto, found in early Iberian music. It usually indicates a metrical composition of 4 lines with 6 or 7 syllables. The endecha is essentially a musical form; a hexasyllable.

The verb endechar - to lament, to sing endechas, is rarely encountered, though found in testimonies by Alfonso de Palencia. It comes from the time before the Expulsion of 1492, and was used within the Jewish community, though popular poems in Galicia already used this type of versification.

== Compositions ==
- A prelude in Dm by Francisco Tárrega
- 5 Endechas for classical guitar by Alfonso Montes. ECH769

== Recordings ==
- Endechar - Lament for Spain (Sephardic Romances and Songs). Capilla Antigua de Chinchilla, Ferrero. Naxos 2010.
