= Akademia Nasionala del Ladino =

Coordinating body of Ladino language

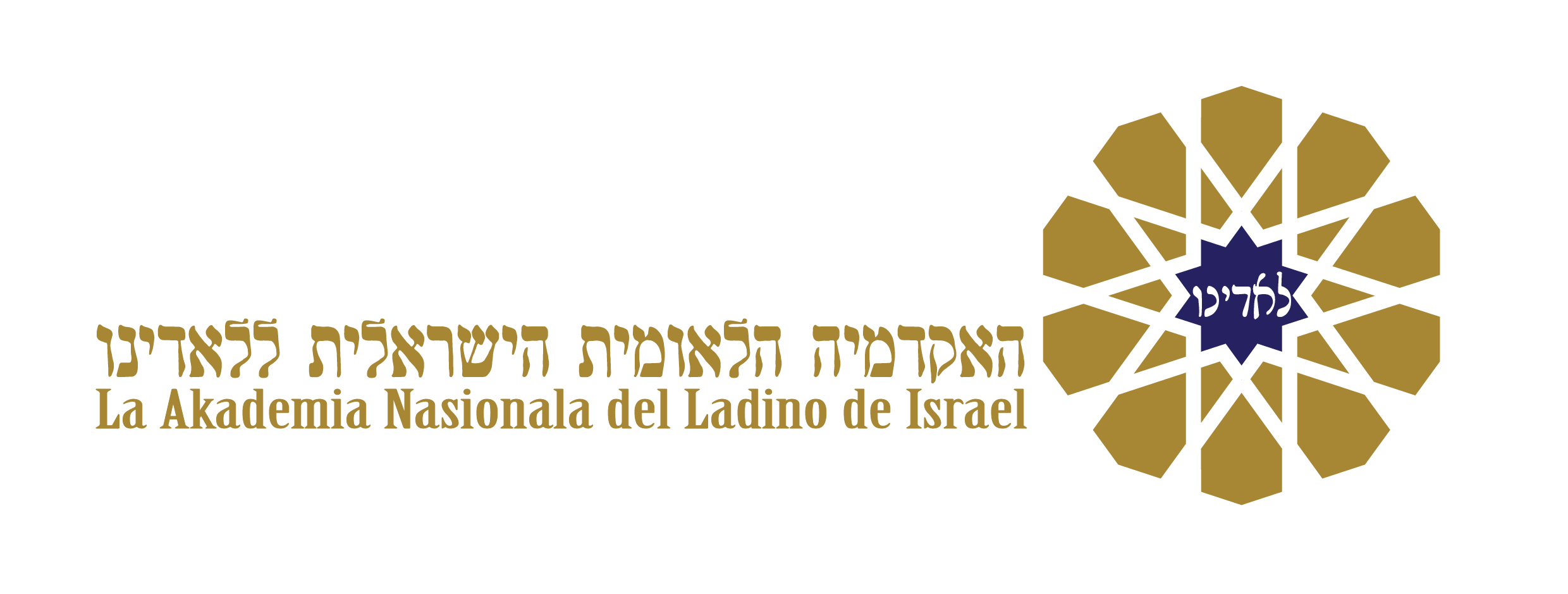
- Logo
- Formation: 3 October 2019; 5 years ago
- Type: Academic association
- Headquarters: Israel
- President: Ora R. Schwarzwald
- Affiliations: Association of Academies of the Spanish Language

The Akademia Nasionala del Ladino (ANL) (English: National Academy of Judeo-Spanish, Spanish: Academia Nacional del Judeoespañol, Hebrew: האקדמיה הלאומית הישראלית ללאדינו) is an academic body in Israel affiliated with the Association of Academies of the Spanish Language in Spain that promotes the preservation, study, and use of the Ladino language, also known as Judeo-Spanish. It collaborates with the Autoridad Nasionala del Ladino, also based in Israel, established by the Israeli government in the 1990s.

The creation of the academy was generally seen as a landmark in the Ladino-speaking community, as it marked the point that the Royal Spanish Academy (RAE) recognized Ladino as a language that was equal to other Spanish dialects.

== History ==
By the 2010s, there were academic, governmental, and cultural initiatives to preserve the dying Ladino language. Ethnologue estimated that there was over 130,000 Ladino speakers in the world, most of whom living in Israel. Other sources estimated that there were between 60,000 and 400,000 speakers. However, many native speakers were elderly and did not pass on the language to their children.

In 2015, the plenary council of the Royal Spanish Academy (RAE), Spain's official Spanish language regulator, elected eight academic specialists in Ladino. The move was interpreted as indication of a growing appreciation in Spain for the cultural heritage of Sephardic Jews in Spain, including the importance of Ladino.

In 2017, the RAE announced plans to create a Ladino academy in Israel alongside the 23 existing academies in Spanish-speaking countries that form the Association of Spanish Language Academies. The organization's stated purpose would be to preserve Ladino and protect its linguistic and cultural heritage. The academy would require recognition and funding from the Israeli government.

On February 20, 2018, the constitution of the Akademia Nasionala del Ladino (ANL) was written. and unanimously agreed upon on October 3, 2019.

On December 9, 2020, ANL held its public event in Jerusalem. The event was attended by the Foreign Minister of Spain Arancha González Laya and included a message from Israeli President Reuven Rivlin.

== Significance ==
The academy's establishment was seen as another move by the Spanish government to make up for the expulsion of the Jews from Spain in 1492, following the offer of Spanish citizenship to Sephardim descended from Jews expelled from Spain.
