= Judaeo-Spanish =

Romance language historically spoken by Sephardi Jews

- Ladino / לאדינו
- djudeo-espanyol; Ladino; גֿודֿיאו־איספאנייול; ӂудеоэспаньол; иудео-испанский / ӂудезмо; τζ̲ουδέο-εσπανιόλ; جوديو-اسپانيول
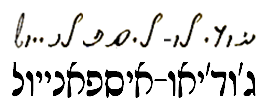
- Judeoespañol in Solitreo and Rashi scripts
- Pronunciation: [dʒuˈðeo‿spaˈɲol] (Note: Pronounced [dʒu-, ʒu-], [-ˈðeo-, -ˈdeo-, -ˈðeu-, -ˈdeu-], [-(e)spa-, -(e)ʃpa-], [-ˈɲol, -ˈɲoɫ, -ˈnjol, -ˈnjoɫ] in different dialects.)
- Native to: Spain, Israel, Turkey, Greece (12 reported 2017), Bosnia and Herzegovina (2 as of 2022), Morocco (Ḥaketía dialect), Brazil (Ḥaketía dialect), Algeria (Tetuani Dialect)
- Region: Mediterranean Basin (native region), formerly also the Americas
- Ethnicity: Sephardic Jews
- Native speakers: 51,000 (2018)
- Language family: Indo-European: Italic; Latino-Faliscan; Latin; Romance; Italo-Western; Western Romance; Gallo-Iberian; Ibero-Romance; West Iberian; Castilian; Judaeo-Spanish
- Early forms: Vulgar Latin: Proto-Romance; Old Spanish
- Dialects: South-Eastern (Istanbul, Salonica); North-Eastern; North-Western (Sarajevo); Haketia (Tangiers, Tetuani)
- Writing system: Mainly Latin alphabet; also Hebrew (normally using Rashi or Solitreo); formerly Greek, Cyrillic and Aljamiado (Perso-Arabic)

Official status
- Recognised minority language in: Bosnia and Herzegovina; France; Israel

Language codes
- ISO 639-2: lad Ladino
- ISO 639-3: lad Ladino
- Glottolog: ladi1251 Ladino
- ELP: Ladino
- Linguasphere: 51-AAB-bd
- IETF: lad
- Historical Judeo-Spanish speech communities in the Mediterranean. Ringed circles represent modern speech communities.

Judaeo-Spanish (alternatively spelled Judeo-Spanish; autonym Djudeo-Espanyol, Hebrew script: גֿודֿיאו־איספאנייול), also known as Ladino, Judezmo, or Spaniolit, is a Romance language derived from Castilian Old Spanish.

It has been spoken by Sephardic Jews since they were expelled from the Iberian Peninsula after the Edict of Expulsion, and with their migrations it spread throughout the Ottoman Empire (the Balkans, Greece, Turkey, West Asia, and North Africa) as well as France, Italy, the Netherlands, Morocco, and England. It is today spoken mainly by Sephardic minorities in more than 30 countries, with most speakers residing currently in Israel. Although it has no official status in any country, it has been acknowledged as a minority language in Bosnia and Herzegovina, Israel, and France.

The core vocabulary of Judaeo-Spanish is Old Spanish, and it has numerous elements from the other old Romance languages of the Iberian Peninsula: Aragonese language, Old Catalan, Asturleonese, Galician-Portuguese, and Andalusi Romance. The language has been further influenced by Ottoman Turkish and Semitic vocabulary, such as Hebrew, Aramaic, and Arabic—especially in the domains of religion, law, and spirituality—and most of the vocabulary for new and modern concepts has been adopted through French and Italian. Furthermore, the language is influenced to a lesser degree by other local languages of the Balkans, such as Greek, Bulgarian, and Serbo-Croatian.

Historically, the Rashi script and its cursive form Solitreo have been the main orthographies for writing Ladino. However, today it is mainly written with the Latin alphabet, though some other alphabets such as Hebrew and Cyrillic are still in use. Judaeo-Spanish has been known also by other names, such as: Español (Espanyol, Spaniol, Spaniolish, Espanioliko), Judió (Judyo, Djudyo) or Jidió (Jidyo, Djidyo), Judesmo (Judezmo, Djudezmo), Sefaradhí (Sefaradi) or Ḥaketía (in North Africa). In Turkey, and formerly in the Ottoman Empire, it has been traditionally called Yahudice in Turkish, meaning the 'Jewish language.' In Israel, Hebrew speakers usually call the language Ladino, Espanyolit or Spanyolit.

Ladino, once the Jewish lingua franca of the Adriatic Sea, the Balkans, and the Middle East, and renowned for its rich literature, especially in Salonika, today is under serious threat of extinction. Most native speakers are elderly, and the language is not transmitted to their children or grandchildren for various reasons; consequently, all Judeo-Spanish-speaking communities are undergoing a language shift. In 2018, four native speakers in Bosnia were identified; however, two of them have since died, David Kamhi in 2021 and Moris Albahari in late 2022. In some expatriate communities in Spain, Latin America, and elsewhere, there is a threat of assimilation by modern Spanish. It is experiencing, however, a minor revival among Sephardic communities, especially in music.

In 2017 the Royal Spanish Academy announced plans to boost the conservation of the Ladino language by opening a Judeo-Spanish branch in Israel to its existing Association of Academies of the Spanish Language.

Darío Villanueva described Judeo-Spanish as “an extraordinarily important cultural and historical phenomenon” that was overdue an academy of its own.

== Name ==
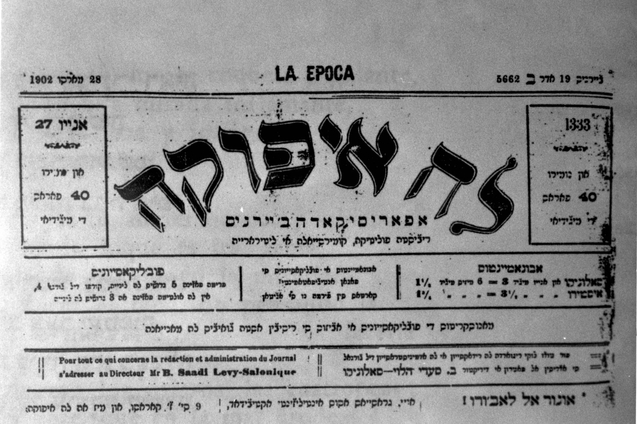
A 1902 Issue of La Epoca, a Judeo-Spanish newspaper from Salonica (Thessaloniki) during the Ottoman Empire

The Jewish scholar Joseph Nehama, author of the comprehensive Dictionnaire du judéo-espagnol, referred to the language as Judeo-Espagnol. The 1903 Hebrew–Judeo-Spanish Haggadah entitled "Seder Haggadah shel pesaḥ ʿim pitron be-lashon sefaradi" (סדר הגדה של פסח עם פתרון בלשון ספרדי), from the Sephardic community of Livorno, Italy, refers to the language used for explanation as the Sefaradi language. The rare Judeo-Spanish-language textbook entitled Nuevo Silibaryo Espanyol, published in Salonica in 1929, referred to the language as Espanyol and lingua Djudeo-Espanyola.

The language is also called Judeo-Espanyol, (Note: Speakers use different orthographical conventions depending on their social, educational, national and personal backgrounds, and there is no uniformity in spelling although some established conventions exist. The endonym Judeo-Espagnol is also spelled as Cudeo-Espanyol, Djudeo-Espagnol, Djudeo-Espanyol, Dschudeo-Espanjol, Dzhudeo-Espanyol, Džudeo-Espanjol, Dzsudeo-Eszpanyol (Hungary), Dżudeo-Espańol, Giudeo-Espagnol or Giudeo-Espaneol (Italy), Ġudeo-Espanjol, Ǧudéo-Españól, Judeo-Espaniol, Ĵudeo-Español and Judeo-Espanýol, Tzoudeo-Espaniol (Greece), Xhudeo-Espanjol. See the infobox for parallel spellings in scripts other than Latin.) Judeoespañol, Sefardí, Judío, and Espanyol or Español sefardita; Haketia (from Arabic: حكى, romanized: ḥakà 'tell') refers to the dialect of North Africa, especially Morocco. Judeo-Spanish has also been referred to as Judesmo (also Judezmo, Djudesmo or Djudezmo). The dialect of the Oran area of Algeria was called Tétuani after the Moroccan city of Tétouan since many Orani Jews came from there. In Israel, the language is known as Spanyolit or Espanyolit. The names Djidio, Kasteyano Muestro, and Spanyol de mozotros have also been proposed to refer to the language; regional names to refer to the language include kastiyano viejo, sepharadit, ekseris romeka, yahudije, and musevije.

An entry in Ethnologue claims, "The name 'Judesmo' is used by Jewish linguists and Turkish Jews and American Jews; 'Judeo-Spanish' by Romance philologists; 'Ladino' by laymen, initially in Israel; 'Haketia' by Moroccan Jews; 'Spanyol' by some others." That does not reflect the historical usage. In the Judaeo-Spanish press of the 19th and 20th centuries the native authors referred to the language almost exclusively as Espanyol, which was also the name that its native speakers spontaneously gave to it for as long as it was their primary spoken language. More rarely, the bookish Judeo-Espanyol has also been used since the late 19th century.

Most speakers of Judeo-Spanish from westernized Turkish or Israeli society prefer the name Ladino, probably because it was less denotative of Jewish identity than the others. In recent decades in Israel, followed by the United States and Spain, the language has come to be referred to as Ladino (Ladino: לאדינו), literally meaning 'Latin'. This name for the language was promoted by the Autoridad Nasionala del Ladino. However, speakers of the language in Israel referred to their mother tongue as Espanyolit or Spanyolit. Native speakers of the language consider the name Ladino to be incorrect, having for centuries reserved the term for the "semi-sacred" language used in word-by-word translations from the Bible, which is distinct from the spoken vernacular. According to linguist Paul Wexler, Ladino is a written language that developed in the eighteenth century and is distinct from spoken Judeo-Spanish. According to the website of the Jewish Museum of Thessaloniki, the cultural center of Sephardic Judaism after the expulsion from Spain,

Ladino is not spoken, rather, it is the product of a word-for-word translation of Hebrew or Aramaic biblical or liturgical texts made by rabbis in the Jewish schools of Spain. In these translations, a specific Hebrew or Aramaic word always corresponded to the same Spanish word, as long as no exegetical considerations prevented this. In short, Ladino is only Hebrew clothed in Spanish, or Spanish with Hebrew syntax. The famous Ladino translation of the Bible, the Biblia de Ferrara (1553), provided inspiration for the translation of numerous Spanish Christian Bibles.

The derivation of the name Ladino is complicated. Before the expulsion of Jews from Spain, the word meant "literary Spanish" as opposed to other dialects, or "Romance" distinct from Arabic. One derivation has Ladino as derived from the verb enladinar, meaning "to translate", from when Jews, Christians and Arabs translated works from Hebrew, Greek, and Arabic into Spanish during the times of Alfonso X of Castile. (The first European-language grammar and dictionary of Spanish referred to it as ladino or ladina. In the Middle Ages, the word Latin was frequently used to mean simply 'language', particularly one understood: a latiner or latimer meant a translator.) Following the Expulsion, Jews spoke of "the Ladino" to mean the word-for-word translation of the Bible into Old Spanish. By extension, Ladino has generally been used to refer to that style of Spanish in the same way that (among Kurdish Jews) Targum has been used to refer to Judeo-Aramaic languages and Arab Jews, and sharḥ has come to mean Judeo-Arabic.

Judaeo-Spanish Ladino should not be confused with the Ladin language (Italian: ladino), spoken in part of Northeast Italy. Ladin has nothing to do with Jews or with Spanish beyond being a Romance language, a property that it shares with French, Italian, Portuguese and Romanian.

== Origins ==
At the time of the expulsion from Spain, the day-to-day language of the Jews of different regions of the peninsula was hardly, if at all, different from that of their Christian neighbors. There may have been some dialect mixing to form a sort of Jewish lingua franca. There was, however, a special style of Spanish used for purposes of study or translation, featuring a more archaic dialect, a large number of Hebrew and Aramaic loanwords and a tendency to render Hebrew word order literally (hal-layla haz-ze "this night" was rendered la noche la esta instead of the normal Spanish esta noche). As mentioned above, authorities confine the term Ladino to that style.

Following the Expulsion of Jews from Spain, the process of dialect mixing continued, but Castilian Spanish remained by far the largest contributor. The daily language was increasingly influenced by both the language of study and the local non-Jewish vernaculars, such as Greek and Turkish. It came to be known as Judesmo and, in that respect, the development is parallel to that of Yiddish. However, many speakers, especially among community leaders, also had command of a more formal style, "castellano", which was closer to the Spanish at the time of the Expulsion.

== Source languages ==
=== Spanish ===
The grammar, the phonology, and about 60% of the vocabulary of Judaeo-Spanish is essentially Spanish but, in some respects, it resembles the dialects in southern Spain and South America, rather than the dialects of Central Spain. For example, it has yeísmo ("she" is eya/ella [ˈeja] (Judaeo-Spanish), instead of ella) as well as seseo.

In many respects, it reproduces the Spanish of the time of the Expulsion, rather than the modern variety, as it retains some archaic features such as the following:

- Modern Spanish j, pronounced [x], corresponds to two different phonemes in Old Spanish: x, pronounced /ʃ/, and j, pronounced /ʒ/. Judaeo-Spanish retains the original sounds. Similarly, g before e or i remains [d͡ʒ] or /ʒ/, not [x].
  - Contrast basho ('low' or 'down,' with /ʃ/, modern Spanish bajo) and mujer ('woman' or 'wife,' spelled the same, with /ʒ/).
- Modern Spanish z (c before e or i), pronounced [s] or [θ], like the th in English think, corresponds to two different phonemes in Old Spanish: ç (c before e or i), pronounced [ts]; and z (in all positions), pronounced [dz]. In Judaeo-Spanish, they are pronounced [s] and [z], respectively.
  - Contrast korasón ('heart,' with /s/, modern Spanish corazón) and dezir ('to say,' with /z/, modern Spanish decir).
- In modern Spanish, the use of the letters b and v is determined partly based on earlier forms of the language and partly based on Latin etymology. Both letters represent one phoneme, (/b/), realized as [b] or as [β] according to its position. In Judaeo-Spanish, /b/ and /v/ are different phonemes: boz /bɔs/ 'voice' vs. vos /vɔs/ 'you'. v is a labiodental "v," like in English, rather than a bilabial.

=== Portuguese and other Iberian languages ===
In some respects, the phonology of both the consonants and part of the lexicon is closer to Portuguese and Catalan than to modern Spanish. This is partially explained by direct influence, but also because Portuguese, Old Spanish and Catalan retained some of the characteristics of medieval Ibero-Romance languages that Spanish later lost. There was mutual influence with the Judaeo-Portuguese of the Portuguese Jews.

Contrast Judaeo-Spanish daínda ('still') with Portuguese ainda (Galician ainda or aínda, Asturian aína or enaína) and Spanish aún or the initial consonants in Judaeo-Spanish fija, favla ('daughter,' 'speech'), Portuguese filha, fala Galician filha or filla, fala, Asturian fía, fala, Aragonese filla, fabla, Catalan filla), Spanish hija, habla. It sometimes varied with dialect, as in Judaeo-Spanish popular songs, both fijo and hijo ('son') are found.

The Judaeo-Spanish pronunciation of s as "[ʃ]" before a "k" sound or at the end of certain words (such as seis, pronounced [seʃ], for 'six') is shared with Portuguese (as spoken in Portugal, most of Lusophone Asia and Africa, and in a plurality of Brazilian varieties and registers with either partial or total forms of coda |S| palatalization) but not with Spanish.

=== Hebrew and Aramaic ===
Like other Jewish vernaculars, Judaeo-Spanish incorporates many Hebrew and Aramaic words, mostly for religious concepts and institutions. Examples are haham ('rabbi', from Hebrew ḥakham) and kal ('synagogue', from Hebrew qahal). Some Judeo-Spanish words of Hebrew or Aramaic origin have more poetic connotations than their Spanish equivalents. Compare gaava ('pride, arrogance') from Hebrew ga'avá with arrogansya ('arrogance') from Spanish arrogancia.

=== Turkish ===
The majority of Judaeo-Spanish speaking people resided in the Ottoman Empire, although a large minority on the northern Coast of Morocco and Algeria existed. As such, words of Turkish origin were incorporated into the local dialect of the language. Examples include emrenear ('rejoice') from Turkish imrenmek.

Some of these words themselves were inherited into Turkish from Arabic or Persian. Examples include bilbiliko ('nightingale'), from Persian (via Turkish) bülbül and gam ('sorrow, anxiety, grief') from Arabic (via Persian then Turkish) ġamm.

The Turkish agentive suffix -ci (denoting a profession) was borrowed into Judaeo-Spanish as the suffix -djí. It can be found in words like halvadjí ('candyman'), derived from halva + -djí.

=== French ===
Due to the influence of the Alliance Israélite Universelle in the westernization and modernization of Judaeo-Spanish speaking communities, many words of French origin were adopted. Most of these words refer to Western European innovations and introductions. Examples include: abazur ('lampshade'), from French abat-jour, fardate ('apply makeup'), from French se farder, and fusil ('gun') from French fusil. Some French political and cultural elements are present in Judaeo-Spanish. For example, ir al Bismark ('to go to the Bismark') was a phrase used in some Judaeo-Spanish communities in the late 19th century to mean 'to go to the restroom', referring to the German Chancellor, Otto von Bismarck (an unpopular figure in France), as a euphemism for toilet.

=== Arabic ===
Because of the large number of Arabic words in Spanish generally, it is not always clear whether some of these words were introduced before the Expulsion or adopted later; modern Spanish replaced some of these loans with Latinisms after the Reconquista, where Judaeo-Spanish speakers had no motivation to do so. Some Arabic words were borrowed via Turkish or Persian.

Haketia, the variety of Judaeo-Spanish spoken in the Maghreb, has substantial influence from Moroccan and Algerian Arabic, as well as local Amazigh languages. The Jewish community of Tetuan spoke its own particular dialect. The varieties of Judaeo-Spanish spoken in the Levant and Egypt have some influence from Levantine Arabic and Egyptian Arabic respectively.

=== Other source languages ===
Judeao-Spanish speaking communities often incorporated words or phrases from surrounding languages. Greek, South Slavic, Italian, and Romanian borrowings can be found in those respective communities.

== Varieties ==
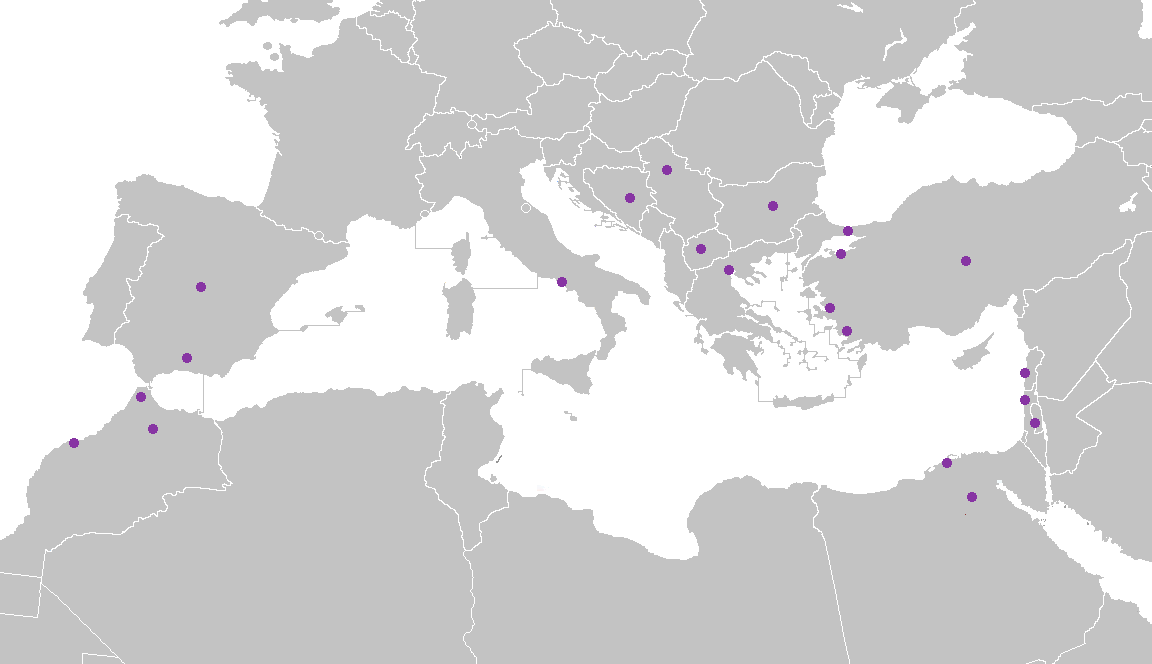
Judaeo-Spanish speaking communities in the Mediterranean

A common way of dividing Judaeo-Spanish is by splitting first Haketia, or "Western Judaeo-Spanish", from other varieties, collectively referred to as "Eastern Judaeo-Spanish". Within Eastern Judaeo-Spanish, further division is made based on city of origin.

Aldina Quintana split Eastern Ladino into three groups:

1. Grupo noroccidental (Northwest group), centered around Sarajevo (Bosnia). It also includes the dialects of Bitola (Macedonia) and Kastoria (Greece). The most distinct characteristics of this group are: the reduction of /r/ and /ɾ/ into /ɾ/ and the conservation of ⟨rd⟩ as in ⟨gordo⟩.
2. Grupo nororiental (Northeast group) that includes most of (northern) Bulgaria and Romania including Sofia and Bucharest. It represented an intermediate state between the other varieties: the reduction of /r/ and /ɾ/ into /ɾ/, but the metathesis of ⟨rd⟩ into ⟨dr⟩ as in ⟨godro⟩.
3. Grupo suroriental (Southeast group) that included the main Sephardic cultural hubs of Salonika (Greece) and Istanbul (Turkiye), as well as the remainder of Anatolia, and Eastern Greece. The varieties of this group maintain the gradient in difference between /e : i/ and /o : u/ in the final position, as well as maintaining a difference between /r/ : /ɾ/. The metathesis of ⟨rd⟩ into ⟨dr⟩ is also present.

While unsorted, the variety of spoken in Judeo-Spanish in Italy (Venice, Trieste, Ferrera) and Budapest more closely followed the Northwest group. Egyptian Judeo-Spanish (Alexandria, Cairo) followed more the patterns of the Southeast Group. Levantine Judeo-Spanish (Jerusalem, Jaffa, Hebron) and Rhodesli Judeo-Spanish represented intermediate states, more similar to the Northeast group. Although Levantine Judeo-Spanish phonology and syntax, especially its usage of [ħ], [ʕ], [ʔ], and [h] was unique enough to be defined separately.

Differences between varieties usually include phonology and lexicon. The dialect spoken in the Macedonian city of Bitola (traditionally referred to as Monastir) has relatively many lexical differences as compared with other varieties of Judeao-Spanish. An example of this can be seen is the word for 'carriage'. In many dialects, such as those that were spoken in Istanbul and Thessaloniki, araba is used, a loanword from Arabic via Turkish, while the Monastir dialect uses karrose, possibly from Italian. The dialect spoken in the Greek island of Rhodes has the unique difference that when a word ends with o, it is pronounced as u.

== Phonology ==
The number of phonemes in Judaeo-Spanish varies by dialect. Its phonemic inventory consists of 24-26 consonants and 5 vowels.

=== Consonants ===
Consonant phonemes in Istanbul Judaeo-Spanish
	Bilabial	Labio- dental	Dental	Alveolar	Post- alveolar	Palatal	Velar	Glottal
Nasal	m			n		(ɲ)	(ŋ)	
Stop	p b		t d				k ɡ	
Affricate					t͡ʃ d͡ʒ			
Fricative	(β)	f v	(ð)	s z	ʃ ʒ		x (ɣ)	(h)
Trill				r				
Tap				(ɾ)				
Approximant				l		j	w	

Consonant phonemes in other dialects
	Bilabial	Labio- dental	Dental	Alveolar	Post- alveolar	Palatal	Velar	Uvular	Pharyngeal	Glottal
Nasal	m			n		ɲ				
Stop	p b		t d				k g	(q)		
Affricate				(t͡s)	t͡ʃ d͡ʒ					
Fricative		f v	(ð)	s z	ʃ ʒ		x		(ħ) (ʕ)	(h)
Trill				(r)						
Tap				ɾ						
Approximant			(ð̞)			j				
Lateral				l						

Notes:

- Most dialects merge /ð~ð̞/ with /d/ and /ħ/ with /x/.
- Some dialects merge the rhotic phonemes. The realization of the merged rhotic is variable, though speakers typically pronounce it as a tap.
- /t͡s/ and /h/ only appear in loanwords. Some dialects merge /t͡s/ with /s/.
- /q/ and /ʕ/ only appear in dialects heavily influenced by Arabic, such as Haketia.
- Voiceless plosives in initial position have aspiration.

=== Vowels ===
Vowel phonemes
	Front	Back
Close	i (y)	u
Mid	e (ø)	o
Open	a	

Notes:

- Front rounded vowels only appear in French loanwords. They do not exist in every dialect.

=== Phonological differences from Spanish ===
As exemplified in the Sources section above, much of the phonology of Judaeo-Spanish is similar to that of standard modern Spanish. Here are some exceptions:

- It is claimed that, unlike all other non-creole varieties of Spanish, Judaeo-Spanish does not contrast the trill /r/ and the tap/flap /ɾ/. However, that claim is not universally accepted.
- The Spanish /nue-/ is /mue-/ in some dialects of Judaeo-Spanish: nuevo, nuestro → muevo, muestro.
- The Judaeo-Spanish phoneme inventory includes separate [d͡ʒ] and [ʒ]: jurnal /ʒuɾˈnal/ ('newspaper') vs jugar/djugar /d͡ʒuˈgar/ ('to play'). Neither phoneme is used in modern Spanish, where they have been replaced by the jota [x]: jornal /xor'nal/, jugar /xu'gar/.
- While Spanish pronounces both b and v as /b/ ([b] or [β]), Judeo-Spanish distinguishes between the two, with b representing [b~β] and v representing [v]: bivir /biˈviɾ/ ('to live').
- Judaeo-Spanish has (at least in some varieties) little or no diphthongization of tonic vowels, e.g. in the following lullaby:
  - (Judaeo-Spanish text) Durme, durme, kerido ijiko, [...] Serra tus lindos ojikos, [...]
  - (Equivalent Spanish) Duerme, duerme, querido hijito, [...] Cierra tus lindos ojitos, [...]
  - (Translation) Sleep, Sleep, beloved little son, [...] close your beautiful little eyes, [...]
- There is a tendency to drop [s] at the end of a word or syllable, as in Andalusian Spanish and many other Spanish dialects in Spain and the Americas: amargasteis -> amargátex/amargatesh ('you have embittered').
- The form Dios -> Dio ('God') is sometimes explained as an example of dropping the final [s], or more often as an example of folk etymology: taking the s as a plural ending (which it is not) and attributing it to Christian trinitarianism. Thus, removing the s supposedly produced a more clearly monotheistic word for God. This is probably a folk etymology, however, as dio is an Old Spanish alternative spelling of dios, the former derived from the Latin accusative form deum and the latter from the nominative form deus.

== Morphology ==
Judaeo-Spanish is distinguished from other Spanish dialects by the presence of the following features:

- Judaeo-Spanish maintains the second-person pronouns tú/tu (informal singular), vos (formal singular) and vosotros/vozotros (plural); the third-person él/ella/ellos/ellas / el/eya/eyos/eyas are also used in the formal register. The Spanish pronouns usted and ustedes do not exist.
- In verbs, the preterite indicates that an action taken once in the past was also completed at some point in the past. That is as opposed to the imperfect, which refers to any continuous, habitual, unfinished or repetitive past action. Thus, "I ate falafel yesterday" would use the first-person preterite form of 'eat', comí/komí but "When I lived in İzmir, I ran five miles every evening" would use the first-person imperfect form, corría/koria. Though some of the morphology has changed, usage is just as in normative Spanish.
- In general, Judaeo-Spanish uses the Spanish plural morpheme /-(e)s/. The Hebrew plural endings /-im/ and /-ot/ are used with Hebrew loanwords, as well as with a few words from Spanish: ladrón/ladron ('thief'): ladrones, ladronim; hermano/ermano ('brother'): hermanos/hermanim / ermanos/ermanim. Similarly, some loaned feminine nouns ending in -á can take either the Spanish or Hebrew plural: quehilá/keilá ('synagogue'): quehilás/quehilot / keilas/keilot.
- Judaeo-Spanish contains more gendering cases than standard Spanish, prominently in adjectives, (grande/-a, inferior/-ra) as well as in nouns (vozas, fuentas) and in the interrogative qualo/quala / kualo/kuala.

=== Verb conjugation ===
Regular conjugation for the present tense:

	-er verbs (comer/komer: "to eat")	-ir verbs (bivir: "to live")	-ar verbs (favlar: "to speak")
yo	-o : como/komo, bivo, favlo		
tú/tu	-es : comes/komes, bives		-as : favlas
él/el, ella/eya	-e : come/kome, bive		-a : favla
mosotros/mozotros, mosotras/mozotras	-emos : comemos/komemos	-imos : bivimos	-amos : favlamos
vos, vosotros/vozotros, vosotras/vozotras	-ex/esh : comex/komesh	-ix/ish : bivix/bivish	-ax/ash : favlax/favlash
ellos/eyos, ellas/eyas	-en : comen/komen, biven		-an : favlan

Regular conjugation in the preterite:

	-er verbs (comer/komer: "to eat")	-ir verbs (bivir: "to live")	-ar verbs (favlar: "to speak")
yo	-í : comí/komi, biví/bivi, favli/favlí		
tú/tu	-ites : comites/komites, bivites		-ates : favlates
él/el, ella/eya	-yó : comió/komió, bivió/bivio		-ó : favló
mosotros/mozotros, mosotras/mozotras	-imos : comimos/komimos, bivimos, favlimos		
vos, vosotros/vozotros, vosotras/vozotras	-ítex/itesh : comítex/komitesh, bivítex/bivitesh		-átex/atesh : favlátex/favlatesh
ellos/eyos, ellas/eyas	-ieron : comieron/komieron, bivieron		-aron : favlaron

Regular conjugation in the imperfect:

	-er verbs (comer/komer: "to eat")	-ir verbs (bivir: "to live")	-ar verbs (favlar: "to speak")
yo	-ía : comía/komia, bivía/bivia		-ava : favlava
tú/tu	-ías : comías/komias, bivías/bivias		-avas : favlavas
él/el, ella/eya	-ía : comía/komia, bivía/bivia		-ava : favlava
mosotros/mozotros, mosotras/mozotras	-íamos : comíamos/komiamos, bivíamos/biviamos		-ávamos : favlavamos
vos, vosotros/vozotros, vosotras/vozotras	-íax/iash : comíax/komiash, bivíax/biviash		-avax/avash : favlavax/favlavash
ellos/eyos, ellas/eyas	-ían : comían/komian, bivían/bivian		-avan : favlavan

== Syntax ==
Judaeo-Spanish follows Spanish for most of its syntax. (That is not true of the written calque language involving word-for-word translations from Hebrew, which scholars refer to as "Ladino", as described above.) Like Spanish, it generally follows a subject–verb–object word order, has a nominative-accusative alignment, and is considered a fusional or inflected language.

== Orthography ==
The Rashi script, originally used to print the language

Two Israeli organizations, the Akademia Nasionala del Ladino and the Autoridad Nasionala del Ladino, jointly regulate Judaeo-Spanish orthography. The organizations allow speakers to choose between the Hebrew script, which was historically the most prevalent writing system for the language, and the Latin script, which gained prominence after the fall of the Ottoman Empire.

=== Hebrew script ===
Printed works in Judaeo-Spanish use the Rashi script, whereas the handwritten language uses a cursive form of the Hebrew alphabet called Solitreo. In the Hebrew script, a silent ⟨א⟩ must precede word-initial vowels. Moreover, it is necessary to separate adjacent vowels with ⟨א⟩ or ⟨י⟩. Whereas ⟨א⟩ can separate any pair of vowels, ⟨י⟩ can only separate front vowels (/i/ and /e/, both represented by ⟨י⟩) from adjacent vowels. Furthermore, ⟨י⟩ cannot separate diphthongs that include a non-syllabic /u/ ([w]).

Hebrew and Aramaic loanwords and morphemes (except those that were borrowed indirectly through other languages) are spelled according to Hebrew orthography. The rest of the language's lexicon is spelled as illustrated in the following table:

Table of orthography
Grapheme	Name	Phoneme (IPA)	Notes
א	אָלֶף	As a consonant (intervocalically and word-initially before a vowel), silent; As a vowel, /a/	A silent consonantal ⟨א⟩ must precede word-initial vowels. It is also necessary to separate consecutive vowels with a consonantal ⟨א⟩ or ⟨י⟩.; As a consonant, ⟨א⟩ can separate any pair of vowels.; As a vowel, ⟨א⟩ cannot represent /a/ word-finally (see ⟨ה⟩).
בּ	בֵּית	/b/	Only appears in Hebrew and Aramaic loanwords. In native words, the dagesh is unnecessary.
ב	בֵית	/b/ in native words; /v/ in Hebrew and Aramaic loanwords	Cannot represent /v/ in native words (see ⟨ב׳⟩).; Represents an etymological /β/ in Hebrew and Aramaic loanwords.
(ב׳) בﬞ	בֵית רָפֶה	/v/	
ג	גִימֶל	/g/	
(ג׳) גﬞ	גִﬞימֶל	/d͡ʒ/	
ג׳׳	גִ׳׳ימֶל	/t͡ʃ/	
ד	דָּלֶת	/d/	
(ד׳) דﬞ	דָּלֶת רָפֶה	/ð/~/ð̞/	Most dialects merge /ð/~/ð̞/ with /d/. Therefore, Judaeo-Spanish orthography does not always distinguish the two phonemes.
ה	הֵא	As a consonant, /h/ (sometimes silent in unstressed syllables and word-finally); As a vowel (word-finally), /a/	Consonantal /h/ only appears in Hebrew and Aramaic loanwords.; /a/ is represented by ⟨ה⟩ word-finally.
ו	וָאו	As a consonant, /v/ in Hebrew and Aramaic loanwords; As a vowel, /u/ or /o/	In Hebrew and Aramaic loanwords, consonantal ⟨ו⟩ represents an etymological /w/.; In didactic works, authors may add a shurúq to the letter (⟨וּ⟩) to represent /u/, thereby distinguishing /u/ from /o/.
ז	זַיִן	/z/	
(ז׳) זﬞ	זַיִן רָפֶה	/ʒ/	
ח	חֵית	/ħ/	Most dialects merge /ħ/ with /x/.
ט	טֵית	/t/	In Hebrew and Aramaic loanwords, ⟨ט⟩ represents an etymologically pharyngealized /t/.
י	יוֹד	As a consonant (when adjacent to another ⟨י⟩), /j/; As a vowel, /i/ or /e/	When adjacent to a front vowel (/i/ or /e/, both represented by ⟨י⟩), /j/ is represented by a single ⟨י⟩ (see ⟨יי⟩).; In didactic works, authors may add a ḥiríq to the letter (⟨יִ⟩) to represent /i/, thereby distinguishing /i/ from /e/.
יי	יוֹד ג׳׳יפﬞטי	/j/	/j/ is represented by a double ⟨יי⟩, except when it is adjacent to a front vowel (/i/ or /e/, both represented by ⟨י⟩).
כּ	כַּף	/k/	Only appears in Hebrew and Aramaic loanwords.
כ	כַף	/x/	Only appears in Hebrew and Aramaic loanwords.
ל	לָמֶד	/l/	
מ	מֵם	/m/	
נ	נוּן	/n/	
ני		Before ⟨י⟩, usually /ɲ/, though sometimes /n+j/; /n+i/ otherwise	Though ⟨ני⟩ is usually a digraph, as in אינייבﬞי inyeve 'snow,' it may also be a sequence of two letters, as in אינגﬞיניירו indjeniero 'engineer.' When it precedes ⟨י⟩, it is typically a digraph.; When it precedes a front vowel (/i/ or /e/, both represented by ⟨י⟩), /ɲ/ is represented by the digraph ⟨ני⟩ (see ⟨ניי⟩).
ניי		Before central and back vowels (/a/, /o/, and /u/), usually /ɲ/, though sometimes /n+j/; /ɲe/ otherwise	Though ⟨ניי⟩ is usually a trigraph, as in אנייו anyo 'year,' it may also represent a sequence of two phonemes, /n+j/ or /ɲ+e/, as in גﬞונייו djunio 'June' or אינייטו inyeto 'grandson,' respectively. When it precedes central and back vowels (/a/, /o/ and /u/), it is typically a trigraph.
ס	סָמֶךְ	/s/	
ע	עַיִן	silent	Represents an etymological /ʕ/ in Hebrew and Aramaic loanwords.
פּ	פֵּא	/p/	Only appears in Hebrew and Aramaic loanwords. In native words, the dagesh is unnecessary.
פ	פֵא	/p/ in native words; /f/ in Hebrew and Aramaic loanwords	Cannot represent /f/ in native words (see ⟨פﬞ⟩).
(פ׳) פﬞ	פֵא רָפֶה	/f/	
צ	צָדִי	/t͡s/	Only appears in Hebrew and Aramaic loanwords.; Some speakers merge /t͡s/ with /s/.
ק	קוֹף	/k/	Represents an etymological /q/ in Hebrew and Aramaic loanwords.
ר	רֵיש	/ɾ/	
ש	שין	/ʃ/	
שׁ	שִׁין	/ʃ/	Only appears in Hebrew and Aramaic loanwords.
שׂ	שִׂין	/s/	Only appears in Hebrew and Aramaic loanwords, wherein it represents an etymological /ɬ/.
ת	תָו	/t/	Only appears in Hebrew and Aramaic loanwords.

Notes:

- The Hebrew geresh diacritic is used most often when typing, as it is the most accessible, whereas the diacritic rafe is used in handwriting.

=== Latin script ===
This orthography uses an interpunct ⟨·⟩ to distinguish the sequence /s+x/ (written ⟨s·h⟩) from the /ʃ/ phoneme (written ⟨sh⟩). Writers may also use acute accents to mark irregular stress. The regular stress pattern is as follows:

- Words that end with a vowel or with /n/, /s/, or /ʃ/ are paroxytones.
- Words that end with any other consonant are oxytones.

Table of orthography
Grapheme	Name	Phoneme (IPA)
a	A	/a/
b	Be	/b/
ch	Che	/t͡ʃ/
d	De	/d/
dj	Dje	/d͡ʒ/
e	E	/e/
f	Ef	/f/
g	Ge	/g/
h	He	/x/
'h	'He	/h/
i	I	/i/
j	Je	/ʒ/
k	Ka	/k/
l	El	/l/
m	Em	/m/
n	En	/n/
ny	Nye	/ɲ/
o	O	/o/
ö	Ö	/ø/
p	Pe	/p/
r	Er	/ɾ/
rr		/r/
s	Es	/s/
sh	She	/ʃ/
t	Te	/t/
ts		/t͡s/
u	U	/u/
ü	Ü	/y/
v	Ve	/v/
x	Iks	/g+z/
y	Ye	/j/
z	Zed	/z/

=== Historical orthographies ===
Prior to the adoption of the official orthographies, the following systems of writing Judaeo-Spanish had been used or proposed.

- Formerly, the Hebrew-script orthography represented an etymological /ʎ/, which has merged with /j/.
- Historically, the most common form of written Ladino was Rashi script, as well as its cursive form, Solitreo.
- The Greek alphabet and the Cyrillic script were used in the past, but this is rare or nonexistent nowadays.
- In Turkey, Judaeo-Spanish was most commonly written in the Turkish variant of the Latin alphabet. That may have been the most widespread system in use prior to the adoption of the official orthography, as following the decimation of Sephardic communities throughout much of Europe (particularly in Greece and the Balkans) during the Holocaust, the greatest proportion of speakers remaining were Turkish Jews.
- The American Library of Congress has published the romanization standard it uses.
- Works published in Spain usually adopted the standard orthography of modern Spanish to make them easier for modern Spanish speakers to read. The editions often used diacritics to show where the Judaeo-Spanish pronunciation differs from modern Spanish.
- Pablo Carvajal Valdés and others suggested adopting the orthography that was used at the time of the Expulsion

== History ==
In the medieval Iberian Peninsula, now Spain and Portugal, Jews spoke a variety of Romance dialects. Jews in the Middle Ages were instrumental in the development of Spanish into a prestige language. Erudite Jews translated Arabic and Hebrew works, often translated earlier from Greek, into Spanish. Christians translated them again into Latin for transmission to Europe.

Following the 1490s expulsion from Spain and Portugal, most of the Iberian Jews resettled in the Ottoman Empire. Jews in the Ottoman Balkans, Western Asia (especially Turkey), and North Africa (especially Morocco) developed their own Romance dialects, with some influence from Hebrew and other languages, which became what is now known as Judaeo-Spanish. Until recent times, the language was widely spoken throughout the Balkans, Turkey/Western Asia and North Africa, as Judaeo-Spanish had been brought there by the Jewish refugees. Later on, many Portuguese Jews also escaped to France, Italy, the Netherlands and England, establishing small groups in those nations as well, but these spoke Early Modern Spanish or Portuguese rather than Judaeo-Spanish. The contact among Jews of different regions and languages, including Catalan, Leonese and Portuguese developed a unified dialect, differing in some aspects from the Spanish norm that was forming simultaneously in Spain, but some of the mixing may have already occurred in exile rather than in the Iberian Peninsula.

In the 16th century, the development Judeo-Spanish was significantly influenced by the extensive mobility of Sephardic Jews. By the end of the century, Spanish had become the dominant language of commerce for Sephardic communities across Italy and the eastern Mediterranean. This standardization was further supported by practices such as hiring tutors to teach Castilian in Hebrew script, as noted in a 1600 deposition from Pisa. Additionally, itinerant rabbis who preached in the vernacular contributed to the spread and standardization of Judeo-Spanish among diverse Sephardic congregations, including those in Greek- and Arabic-speaking regions.

The closeness and mutual comprehensibility between Judaeo-Spanish and Spanish favoured trade among Sephardim, often relatives, from the Ottoman Empire to the Netherlands and the conversos of the Iberian Peninsula.

Over time, a corpus of literature, both liturgical and secular, developed. Early literature was limited to translations from Hebrew. At the end of the 17th century, Hebrew was disappearing as the vehicle for rabbinic instruction. Thus, a literature appeared in the 18th century, such as Me'am Lo'ez and poetry collections. By the end of the 19th century, the Sephardim in the Ottoman Empire studied in schools of the Alliance Israélite Universelle. French became the language for foreign relations, as it did for Maronites, and Judaeo-Spanish drew from French for neologisms. New secular genres appeared, with more than 300 journals, history, theater, and biographies.

Given the relative isolation of many communities, a number of regional dialects of Judaeo-Spanish appeared, many with only limited mutual comprehensibility, largely because of the adoption of large numbers of loanwords from the surrounding populations, including, depending on the location of the community, from Greek, Turkish, Arabic and, in the Balkans, Slavic languages, especially Serbo-Croatian and Bulgarian. The borrowing in many Judaeo-Spanish dialects is so heavy that up to 30% of their vocabulary is of non-Spanish origin. Some words also passed from Judaeo-Spanish into neighboring languages. For example, the word palavra 'word' (Vulgar Latin parabola; Greek parabole), passed into Turkish, Greek and Romanian with the meaning 'bunk, hokum, humbug, bullshit' in Turkish and Romanian and 'big talk, boastful talk' in Greek (compare the English word palaver).

The language was known as Yahudice (Jewish language) in the Ottoman Empire. In the late 18th century, Ottoman poet Enderunlu Fazıl (Fazyl bin Tahir Enderuni) wrote in his Zenanname: "Castilians speak the Jewish language but they are not Jews."

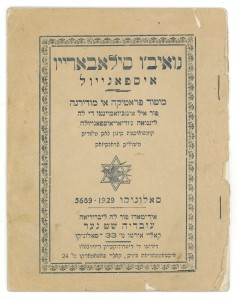
Nuevo Silibaryo Espanyol. Judaeo-Spanish textbook, Salonica, 1929

Judaeo-Spanish was the common language of Salonica during the Ottoman period. The city became part of Greece in 1912 and was subsequently renamed Thessaloniki. Despite the Great Fire of Thessaloniki and mass settlement of Christian refugees, the language remained widely spoken in Salonica until the deportation of 50,000 Salonican Jews in the Holocaust during the Second World War. According to the 1928 census, the language had 62,999 native speakers in Greece. The figure drops down to 53,094 native speakers in 1940, but 21,094 citizens "usually" spoke the language. The language was so prominent in Salonica that the most prestigious monument of the city was known by its Judeo-Spanish name, Las Incantadas (meaning "the enchanted women").

Judaeo-Spanish was also a language used in Donmeh rites (Dönme being a Turkish word for 'convert' to refer to adepts of Sabbatai Tsevi converting to Islam in the Ottoman Empire). An example is Sabbatai Tsevi esperamos a ti. Today, the religious practices and the ritual use of Judaeo-Spanish seems confined to elderly generations.

The Castilian colonization of Northern Africa favored the role of polyglot Sephards, who bridged between Spanish colonizers and Arab and Berber speakers.

From the 17th to the 19th centuries, Judaeo-Spanish was the predominant Jewish language in the Holy Land, but its dialect was different in some respects from the one in Greece and Turkey. Some families have lived in Jerusalem for centuries and preserve Judaeo-Spanish for cultural and folklore purposes although they now use Hebrew in everyday life.

An often-told Sephardic anecdote from Bosnia-Herzegovina has it that as a Spanish consulate was opened in Sarajevo in the interwar period, two Sephardic women passed by. Upon hearing a Catholic priest who was speaking Spanish, they thought that his language meant that he was Jewish.

In the 20th century, the number of speakers declined sharply: entire communities were murdered in the Holocaust, and many of the remaining speakers, many of whom emigrated to Israel, adopted Hebrew. The government of the new nation-state encouraged instruction in Hebrew. Similarly in the US, Sephardic Jews were encouraged to speak English rather than Judaeo-Spanish, therefore, the language was not passed down to younger generations. In Turkey, where there is a large community of Sephardic Jews, Judaeo-Spanish was considered a language of little prestige; additionally, parents refused to teach their children the language, fearing that their children would develop a "Jewish accent" and therefore face discrimination. At the same time, Judaeo-Spanish aroused the interest of philologists, as it conserved language and literature from before the standardization of Spanish.

Judaeo-Spanish is in serious danger of extinction. As of 2011, the majority of fluent speakers are over the age of 70; the descendants of these speakers exhibit little to no knowledge of the language. Nevertheless, it is experiencing a minor revival among Sephardic communities, especially in music. In addition, Sephardic communities in several Latin American countries still use Judaeo-Spanish. There, the language is exposed to the different danger of assimilation to modern Spanish.

Kol Yisrael and Radio Nacional de España hold regular radio broadcasts in Judaeo-Spanish. Law & Order: Criminal Intent showed an episode, titled "A Murderer Among Us", with references to the language. Films partially or totally in Judaeo-Spanish include the Mexican film Novia que te vea (directed by Guita Schyfter), The House on Chelouche Street, and Every Time We Say Goodbye.

Efforts have been made to gather and publish modern Judaeo-Spanish fables and folktales. In 2001, the Jewish Publication Society published the first English translation of Judaeo-Spanish folktales, collected by Matilda Koen-Sarano, Folktales of Joha, Jewish Trickster: The Misadventures of the Guileful Sephardic Prankster. A survivor of Auschwitz, Moshe Ha-Elion, issued his translation into Judeo-Spanish of the ancient Greek epic Odyssey in 2012, in his 87th year, and later completed a translation of the sister epic, the Iliad, into his mother tongue.

The language was initially spoken by the Sephardic Jewish community in India, but was later replaced with Judeo-Malayalam.

== Literature ==
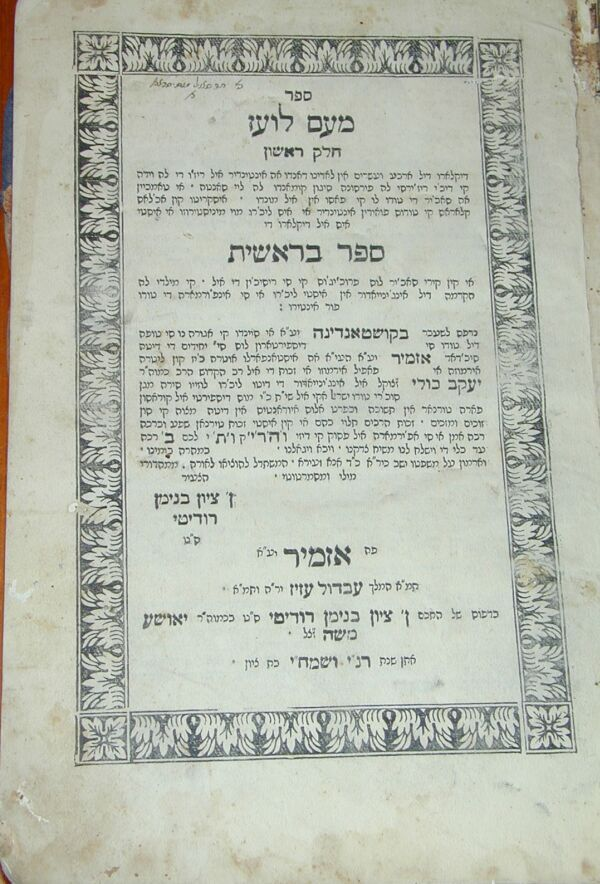
Cover of Me-'am lo'ez

The first printed Judaeo-Spanish book was Me-'am lo'ez in 1730. It was a commentary on the Bible in the Judaeo-Spanish language. Most Jews in the Ottoman Empire knew the Hebrew alphabet but did not speak Hebrew. The printing of Me-'am lo'ez marked the emergence of large-scale printing activity in Judaeo-Spanish in the western Ottoman Empire and in Istanbul in particular. The earliest Judaeo-Spanish books were religious in nature, mostly created to maintain religious knowledge for exiles who could not read Hebrew; the first of the known texts is Dinim de shehitah i bedikah [The Rules of Ritual Slaughter and Inspection of Animals]; (Istanbul, 1510). Texts continued to be focused on philosophical and religious themes, including a large body of rabbinic writings, until the first half of the 19th century. The largest output of secular Judaeo-Spanish literature occurred during the latter half of the 19th and the early 20th centuries in the Ottoman Empire. The earliest and most abundant form of secular text was the periodical press: between 1845 and 1939, Ottoman Sephardim published around 300 individual periodical titles. The proliferation of periodicals gave rise to serialised novels: many of them were rewrites of existing foreign novels into Judaeo-Spanish. Unlike the previous scholarly literature, they were intended for a broader audience of educated men and less-educated women alike. They covered a wider range of less weighty content, at times censored to be appropriate for family readings. Popular literature expanded to include love stories and adventure stories, both of which had been absent from Judaeo-Spanish literary canon. The literary corpus meanwhile also expanded to include theatrical plays, poems and other minor genres.

Multiple documents made by the Ottoman government were translated into Judaeo-Spanish; usually translators used terms from Ottoman Turkish.

== Religious use ==
The Jewish communities of Sarajevo, Bosnia-Herzegovina, and Belgrade, Serbia, still chant part of the Sabbath Prayers (Mizmor David) in Judaeo-Spanish. The Sephardic Synagogue Ezra Bessaroth in Seattle, Washington, United States, was formed by Jews from Turkey and the Greek island of Rhodes, and it uses the language in some portions of its Shabbat services. The Siddur is called Zehut Yosef and was written by Hazzan Isaac Azose.

At Congregation Etz Ahaim of Highland Park, New Jersey, a congregation founded by Sephardic Jews from Salonika, a reader chants the Aramaic prayer B'rikh Shemay in Judaeo-Spanish before he takes out the Torah on Shabbat. That is known as Bendichu su Nombre in Judaeo-Spanish. Additionally, at the end of Shabbat services, the entire congregation sings the well-known Hebrew hymn Ein Keloheinu, which is Non Como Muestro Dio in Judaeo-Spanish.

Non Como Muestro Dio is also included, alongside Ein Keloheinu, in Mishkan T'filah, the 2007 Reform prayerbook.

El Dio Alto (El Dyo Alto) is a Sephardic hymn often sung during the Havdalah service, its currently popular tune arranged by Judy Frankel. Hazzan Isaac Azose, cantor emeritus of Synagogue Ezra Bessaroth and second-generation Turkish immigrant, has performed an alternative Ottoman tune.

Rabbi Aryeh Kaplan translated some scholarly religious texts, including Me'am Loez into Hebrew, English or both.

İzmir's grand rabbis Haim Palachi, Abraham Palacci, and Rahamim Nissim Palacci all wrote in the language and in Hebrew.

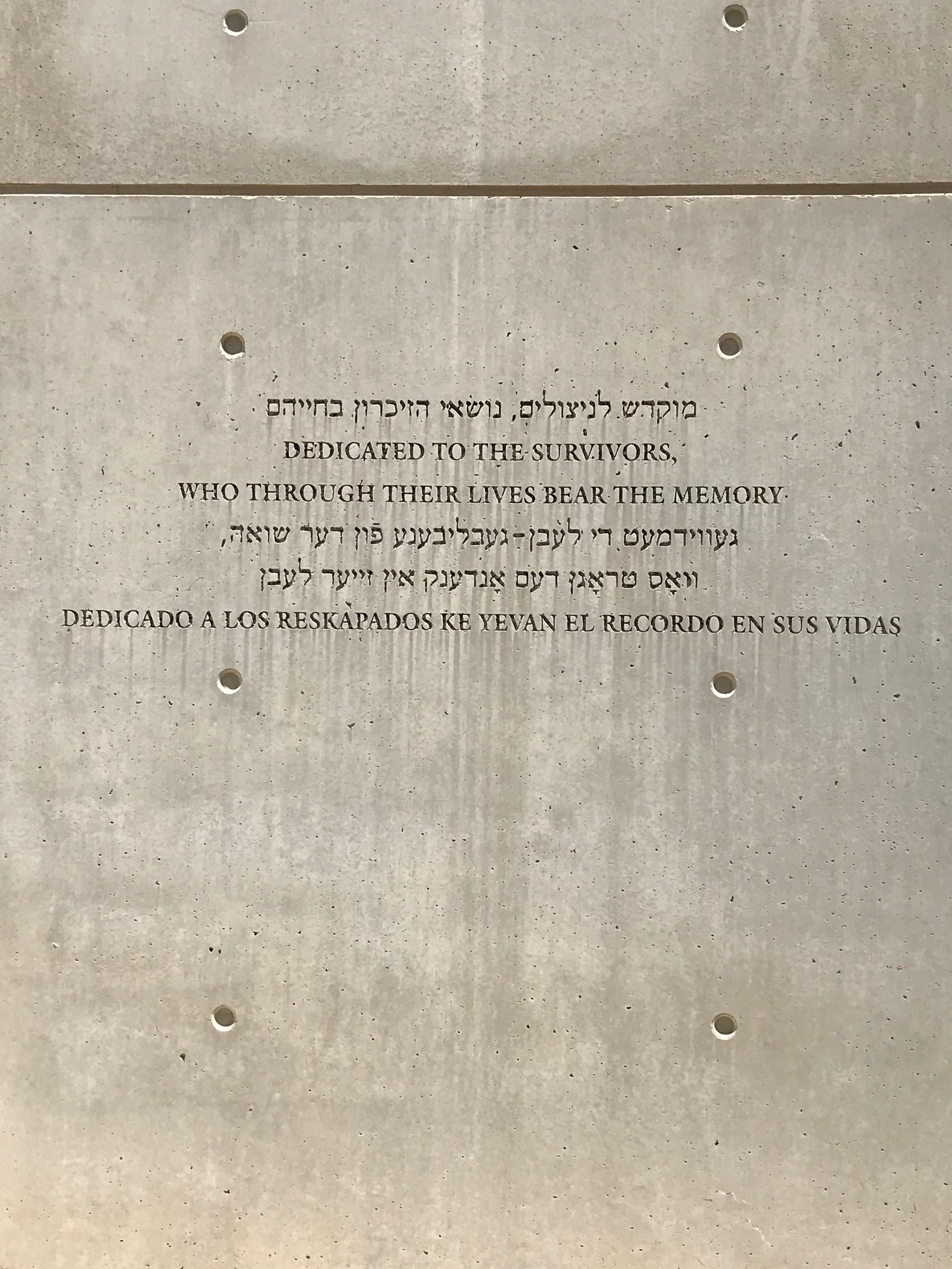
Inscription at Yad Vashem in Hebrew, English, Yiddish, and Judaeo-Spanish

== Modern education and use ==
In 1967, linguist Haïm Vidal Séphiha of the University of Paris became the first professor of Judaeo-Spanish in the world; courses of Judaeo-Spanish have been introduced in universities since then in other European countries, along with research centers dedicated to the study of the language. The National Authority of Ladino, dedicated to the study and promotion of Judaeo-Spanish was established in Jerusalem in 1997.

As with Yiddish, Judaeo-Spanish is seeing a minor resurgence in educational interest in colleges across the United States and in Israel. Almost all American Jews are Ashkenazi, with a tradition based on Yiddish, rather than Judaeo-Spanish, and so institutions that offer Yiddish are more common. As of 2011 the University of Pennsylvania and Tufts University offered Judaeo-Spanish courses among colleges in the United States; INALCO in Paris, the University of the Basque Country and University of Granada in Spain were offering courses as well. In Israel, Moshe David Gaon Center for Ladino Culture at Ben-Gurion University of the Negev is leading the way in education (language and literature courses, Community oriented activities) and research (a yearly scientific journal, international congresses and conferences etc.). Hebrew University also offers courses. The Complutense University of Madrid also used to have courses. Prof. David Bunis taught Judaeo-Spanish at the University of Washington, in Seattle during the 2013–14 academic year. Bunis returned to the University of Washington for the Summer 2020 quarter.

In Spain, the Spanish Royal Academy (RAE) in 2017 announced plans to create a Judaeo-Spanish branch in Israel in addition to 23 existing academies, in various Spanish-speaking countries, that are associated in the Association of Spanish Language Academies. Its stated purpose is to preserve Judaeo-Spanish. The move was seen as another step to make up for the Expulsion, following the offer of Spanish citizenship to Sephardim who had some connection with Spain.

When French-medium schools operated by Alliance Israelite Universelle opened in the Ottoman Empire in the 1860s, the position of Judaeo-Spanish began to weaken in the Ottoman Empire areas. In time Judaeo-Spanish became perceived as a low status language, and Sephardic people began losing connections to that language. Esther Benbassa and Aron Rodrigue, authors of Sephardi Jewry: A History of the Judeo-Spanish Community, 14th–20th Centuries, wrote that the AIU institutions "gallicized" people who attended. As time progressed, Judaeo-Spanish language and culture declined. Although Mary Altabev in 1994 observed limited use of Ladino at home among educated Turkish Jews, Melis Alphan wrote in Hürriyet in 2017 that the Judaeo-Spanish language in Turkey was heading to extinction.

As of 2023 the Ladino supplement of Şalom is the sole monthly newspaper in Ladino. El Amaneser is the sole all Ladino newspaper.

== Samples ==
=== Comparison with other languages ===
Judaeo-Spanish	Aki Yerushalayim orthography	איל גﬞודיאו־איספאנײול איס לה לינגואה פﬞאבﬞלאדה די לוס גﬞודיוס ספﬞרדים ארונגﬞאדוס די לה איספאנײה איניל 1492. איס אונה לינגואה דיריבﬞאדה דיל איספאנײול או איל קאסטעייאנו אי פﬞאבﬞלאדה די 150,000 פירסונאס אין קומוניטאס אין ישראל, לה טורקײה, אנטיקה יוגוסלאבﬞײה, לה גריסײה, איל מארואיקוס, מאיורקה, לה אמעריקא, אינטרי מונגﬞוס אוטרוס לוגאריס. El djudeo-espanyol es la lingua favlada de los djudios sefardim arondjados de la Espanya enel 1492. Es una lingua derivada del espanyol o el kasteyano i favlada de 150.000 personas en komunitas en Israel, la Turkia, antika Yugoslavia, la Gresia, el Maruekos, Mayorka, la Amerika, entre munchos otros lugares.
Judaeo-Spanish	Castilian-inspired orthography	El judeoespañol es la lingua fablada de los judiós sefaradim arronjados de la España en el 1492. Es una lingua derivada del español/casteyano y fablada de 150.000 personas en comunitás en Israel, la Turquía, antica Yugoslavia, la Grecia, el Marruecos, Mayorca, (las) América(s), entre munchos otros lugares.
Spanish		El judeoespañol es la lengua hablada por los judíos sefardíes expulsados (Note: The direct Spanish cognate of Judaeo-Spanish 'arondjado(s)' is 'arrojado(s)', which has the meaning of 'thrown' and 'kicked-out', but not 'exiled' like its Judaeo-Spanish counterpart.) de España en 1492. Es una lengua derivada del español/castellano y hablada por 150.000 personas en comunidades en Israel, Turquía, la antigua Yugoslavia, Grecia, Marruecos, Mallorca, (las) América(s), entre muchos otros lugares.
Asturian		El xudeoespañol ye la llingua falada polos xudíos sefardinos espulsaos d'España en 1492. Ye una llingua derivada del español/castellanu y falada por 150.000 persones en comunidaes n'Israel, Turquía, na antigua Yugoslavia, Grecia, Marruecos, Mallorca, América/nes Amériques, ente munchos otros llugares.
Galician	Standard	O xudeo-español é a lingua falada polos xudeus sefardís expulsados de España en 1492. É unha lingua derivada do español/castelán e falada por 150.000 persoas en comunidades en Israel, Turquía, antiga Iugoslavia, Grecia, Marrocos, Maiorca, América(s), entre moitos outros lugares.
Galician	Reintegrationist	O judeu-espanhol é a língua falada polos judeus sefardis espulsados de/da Espanha em 1492. É uma língua derivada do espanhol/castelão/castelhano e falada por 150.000 pessoas em comunidades em Israel, Turquia, antiga Iugoslávia, Grécia, Marrocos, Maiorca, América(s), entre muitos outros lugares.
Portuguese		O judeu-espanhol é a língua falada pelos judeus sefardis/sefarditas expulsos de/da Espanha em 1492. É uma língua derivada do espanhol/castelhano e falada por 150.000 pessoas em comunidades em Israel, na Turquia, antiga Jugoslávia/Iugoslávia, Grécia, Marrocos, Maiorca, América(s), entre muitos outros lugares.
Aragonese		O chodigo-espanyol ye la luenga parlata por os chodigos sefardís expulsats d'Espanya en 1492. Ye una luenga derivata de l'espanyol/del castellano i parlata por 150.000 personas en comunitatz en Israel, Turquía, l'antiga Yugoslavia, Grecia, Marruecos, Mallorca, (las) América(s), entre muitos atros lugares.
Catalan		El judeoespanyol és la llengua parlada pels jueus sefardites expulsats d'Espanya al 1492. És una llengua derivada de l'espanyol/del castellà i parlada per 150.000 persones en comunitats a Israel, Turquia, l'antiga Iugoslàvia, Grècia, el Marroc, Mallorca, Amèrica/les Amèriques, entre molts altres llocs.
Occitan	Languedocien dialect	Lo judeoespanhòl es la lenga parlada pels jusieus sefarditas expulsats d'Espanha en 1492. Es una lenga venent de l'espanhòl/del castelhan que 150 000 personas la parlan dins de comunautats en Israel, Turquia, èx-Iogoslavia, Grècia, Marròc, Malhòrca, (las) America(s), entre fòrça autres luòcs.
English		Judaeo-Spanish is the language spoken by Sephardic Jews expelled from Spain in 1492. It is a language derived from Spanish and spoken by 150,000 people in communities in Israel, Turkey, the former Yugoslavia, Greece, Morocco, Majorca, the Americas, among many other places.

=== Songs ===
A tradition dating back to at least the 16th century exists of translating piyyutim into Judaeo-Spanish. Fragments from kinnot in Judeo-Spanish from probably the 16th century have been found. It is known that certain women, known as endechederas ("singers of dirges") would attend funerals to sing endechas (dirges), however, none of these endechas are known to have survived.

A tradition of ballads, or romansas, also exists in the Judeo-Spanish tradition, and were predominantly sung by women. Their original purpose was to transmit news; later they became work songs as well as entertainment. They covered a wide range of topics, from childbirth to marriage to death; they could also cover secular topics, such as unhappily married women, incest, violence, and single mothers. In one ballad, a pregnant princess pretends to her mother that she is not pregnant, but rather has indigestion, then proceeds to give birth to her fourth child.

Folklorists have been collecting romances and other folk songs, some dating from before the expulsion. Many religious songs in Judaeo-Spanish are translations of Hebrew, usually with a different tune. For example, here is Ein Keloheinu in Judaeo-Spanish:

Non komo muestro Dio,
Non komo muestro Sinyor,
Non komo muestro Rey,
Non komo muestro Salvador.
etc.

Other songs relate to secular themes such as love:

Adio, kerida
Goodbye, My Love (translation)

Tu madre kuando te pario
Y te kito al mundo,
Korason ella no te dio
Para amar segundo.
Korason ella no te dió
Para amar segundo.

Adio,
Adio kerida,
No kero la vida,
Me l'amargates tu.
Adio,
Adio kerida,
No kero la vida,
Me l'amargates tu.

Va, bushkate otro amor,
Aharva otras puertas,
Aspera otro ardor,
Ke para mi sos muerta.
Aspera otro ardor,
Ke para mi sos muerta.

Adio,
Adio kerida,
No kero la vida,
Me l'amargates tu.
Adio,
Adio kerida,
No kero la vida,
Me l'amargates tú.

When your mother gave birth to you
And brought you into the world
She gave you no heart
To love another.
She gave you no heart
To love another.

Farewell,
Farewell my love,
I no longer want my life
You made it bitter for me
Farewell,
Farewell my love,
I no longer want my life
You made it bitter for me

Go, find yourself another lover,
Knock at other doors,
Wait for another passion
For you are dead to me
Wait for another passion
For you are dead to me

Farewell,
Farewell my love,
I no longer want my life
You made it bitter for me
Farewell,
Farewell my love,
I no longer want my life
You made it bitter for me

Por una Ninya
For a Girl (translation)

Por una ninya tan fermoza
l'alma yo la vo a dar
un kuchilyo de dos kortes
en el korason entro.

For a girl so beautiful
I will give my soul
a double-edged knife
pierced my heart.

No me mires ke'stó kantando
es lyorar ke kero yo
los mis males son muy grandes
no los puedo somportar.

Don't look at me; I am singing,
it is crying that I want,
my sorrows are so great
I can't bear them.

No te lo kontengas tu, fijika,
ke sos blanka komo'l simit,
ay morenas en el mundo
ke kemaron Selanik.

Don't hold your sorrows, young girl,
for you are white like bread,
there are dark girls in the world
who set fire to Thessaloniki.

Quando el Rey Nimrod (Adaptation)
When King Nimrod (translation)

Quando el Rey Nimrod al campo salía
mirava en el cielo y en la estrellería
vido una luz santa en la djudería
que havía de nascer Avraham Avinu.

When King Nimrod was going out to the fields
He was looking at heaven and at the stars
He saw a holy light in the Jewish quarter
[A sign] that Abraham, our father, must have been born.

Avraham Avinu, Padre querido,
Padre bendicho, luz de Yisrael.

Abraham Avinu [our Father], dear father
Blessed Father, light of Israel.

Luego a las comadres encomendava
que toda mujer que prenyada quedara
si no pariera al punto, la matara
que havía de nascer Abraham Avinu.

Then he was telling all the midwives
That every pregnant woman
Who did not give birth at once was going to be killed
because Abraham our father was going to be born.

Avraham Avinu, Padre querido,
Padre bendicho, luz de Yisrael.

Abraham Avinu, dear father
Blessed Father, light of Israel.

La mujer de Terach quedó prenyada
y de día en día le preguntava
¿De qué teneix la cara tan demudada?
ella ya sabía el bien que tenía.

Terach's wife was pregnant
and each day he would ask her
Why do you look so distraught?
She already knew very well what she had.

Avraham Avinu, Padre querido,
Padre bendicho, luz de Yisrael.

Abraham Avinu, dear father
Blessed Father, light of Israel.

En fin de nueve meses parir quería
iva caminando por campos y vinyas,
a su marido tal ni le descubría
topó una meara, allí lo pariría

After nine months she wanted to give birth
She was walking through the fields and vineyards
Such would not even reach her husband
She found a cave; there, she would give birth.

Avraham Avinu, Padre querido,
Padre bendicho, luz de Yisrael.

Abraham Avinu, dear father
Blessed Father, light of Israel.

En aquella hora el nascido avlava
"Andavos mi madre, de la meara
yo ya topó quen me alexara
mandará del cielo quen me accompanyará
porque so criado del Dio bendicho."

In that hour the newborn was speaking
'Get away of the cave, my mother
I will somebody to take me out
He will send from the heaven the one that will go with me
Because I am raised by the blessed God.'

Avraham Avinu, Padre querido,
Padre bendicho, luz de Yisrael

Abraham Avinu, dear father
Blessed Father, light of Israel.

Yo era ninya
I Was a Girl (translation)

Yo era ninya de kaza alta
No savia de sufrir
Por kaer kon ti berbante
Me metites a servir

I was a girl from an upper-class family
And I never knew of any suffering,
Because I fell in love with you, you scoundrel
You've brought me misfortune.

Anachronistically, Abraham—who in the Bible is an Aramean and the very first Hebrew and the ancestor of all who followed, hence his appellation Avinu (Our Father)—is in the Judeo-Spanish song born already in the djudería (modern Spanish: judería), the Jewish quarter. This makes Terach and his wife into Hebrews, as are the parents of other babies killed by Nimrod. In essence, unlike its Biblical model, the song is about a Hebrew community persecuted by a cruel king and witnessing the birth of a miraculous savior—a subject of obvious interest and attraction to the Jewish people who composed and sang it in medieval Spain.

The song attributes to Abraham elements that are from the story of Moses's birth, the cruel king killing innocent babies, with the midwives ordered to kill them, the 'holy light' in the Jewish area, as well as from the careers of Shadrach, Meshach, and Abednego who emerged unscathed from the fiery furnace, and Jesus of Nazareth. Nimrod is thus made to conflate the role and attributes of three archetypal cruel and persecuting kings: Nebuchadnezzar and Pharaoh and Herod

Another example is the Coplas de Purim, a folk song about Purim.

=== Dialectal differences ===
Turkish (Istanbul)	Esto sta bueno. Importa voz soş las ratoneras, i los mansevos son los ratuneros. Dime tu a mi, stuvo kazado este Tolstoy?
Serbo-Croatian (Sarajevo)	Estu sta buenu. Importa vuoztras sos las ratoneras, i lus mansevus son lus ratunis. Dizmi tu a mi, stuvu kazadu esti Tolstoj?
Greek (Thessaloniki)	Esto sta bueno. Importa voz sos las ratoneras, i los mansevos son los ratuneros. Dime tu a mi, stuvo kasado este Tolstoi?
Macedonian (Bitola)	Estu sta buenu. Impurta vuoztras sos las ratoneras, i lus mansevus son lus ratunis. Dizmje tu a mi, stuvu kazadu isti Tolstoj?

=== Selected words by origin ===
Words derived from Arabic:

- Alforría – 'liberty, freedom'
- Alhát – 'Sunday'
- Atemar – 'to terminate'
- Saraf – 'money changer'
- Shara – 'wood'
- Ziara – 'cemetery visit'

Words derived from Hebrew:

- Alefbet – 'alphabet' (from the Hebrew names of the first two letters of the alphabet)
- Anav – 'humble, obedient'
- Arón – 'grave'
- Atakanear – 'to arrange'
- Badkar – 'to reconsider'
- Beraxa – 'blessing'
- Din – 'religious law'
- Kal – 'community', 'synagogue'
- Kamma – 'how much?', 'how many?'
- Maaráv – 'west'
- Maasé – 'story, event'
- Maabe – 'deluge, downpour, torrent'
- Mazal – 'star', 'destiny'
- Met – 'dead'
- Niftar – 'dead'
- Purimlik – 'Purim present' (eerived from the Hebrew Purim + Turkic ending -lik)
- Sedaka – 'charity'
- Tefilá – 'prayer'
- Zahut – 'blessing'

Words derived from Persian:

- Chay – 'tea'
- Chini – 'plate'
- Paras – 'money'
- Shasheo – 'dizziness'

Words derived from Portuguese:

- Abastádo – 'almighty, omnipotent' (referring to God)
- Aínda – 'yet'
- Chapeo – 'hat'
- Preto – 'black' (in color)
- Trocar – 'to change'

Words derived from Turkish:

- Balta – 'axe'
- Biterear – 'to terminate'
- Boyadear – 'to paint, color'
- Innat – 'whim'
- Kolay – 'easy'
- Kushak – 'belt, girdle'
- Maalé – 'street, quarters, neighborhood'; Maalé yahudí – 'Jewish quarters'

Words derived from Greek:

- meldar – 'read, learn'
- bora – 'storm, torrential rain, gust of wind'
- demet – 'bouquet'
- domate – 'tomato'
- fasaria – 'a fuss, to-do, agitation, bustle'
- fota – 'the moment when work, motion, traffic reaches its highest intensity'
- kuturu – 'a pile of mismatched objects, of overripe fruit, of mixed leftovers'

== Modern singers ==
Jennifer Charles and Oren Bloedow from the New York-based band Elysian Fields released a CD in 2001 called La Mar Enfortuna, which featured modern versions of traditional Sephardic songs, many sung by Charles in Judeo-Spanish. The American singer Tanja Solnik has released several award-winning albums that feature songs in the languages: From Generation to Generation: A Legacy of Lullabies and Lullabies and Love Songs. There are a number of groups in Turkey that sing in Judeo-Spanish, notably Janet – Jak Esim Ensemble, Sefarad, Los Pasharos Sefaradis and the children's chorus Las Estreyikas d'Estambol. There is a Brazilian-born singer of Sephardic origins, Fortuna, who researches and plays Judeo-Spanish music.

Israeli folk-duo Esther & Abi Ofarim recorded the song "Yo M'enamori d'un Aire" for their 1968 album Up To Date. Esther Ofarim recorded several Judaeo-Spanish songs as a solo artist. These included "Povereta Muchachica", "Noches Noches", "El Rey Nimrod", "Adio Querida" and "Pampaparapam".

The Jewish Bosnian-American musician Flory Jagoda recorded two CDs of music taught to her by her grandmother, a Sephardic folk singer, among a larger discography. Following her death in 2021, gentile musicians in Bosnia have recorded music in Judaeo-Spanish as well.

The cantor Ramón Tasat, who learned Judeo-Spanish at his grandmother's knee in Buenos Aires, has recorded many songs in the language, with three of his CDs focusing primarily on that music.

The Israeli singer Yasmin Levy has also brought a new interpretation to the traditional songs by incorporating more "modern" sounds of Andalusian Flamenco. Her work revitalizing Sephardic music has earned Levy the Anna Lindh Euro-Mediterranean Foundation Award for promoting cross-cultural dialogue between musicians from three cultures: In Yasmin Levy's own words:

I am proud to combine the two cultures of Ladino and flamenco, while mixing in Middle Eastern influences. I am embarking on a 500 years old musical journey, taking Ladino to Andalusia and mixing it with flamenco, the style that still bears the musical memories of the old Moorish and Jewish-Spanish world with the sound of the Arab world. In a way it is a 'musical reconciliation' of history.

Notable music groups performing in Judeo-Spanish include Voice of the Turtle, Oren Bloedow and Jennifer Charles' La Mar Enfortuna and Vanya Green, who was awarded a Fulbright Fellowship for her research and performance of this music. She was recently selected as one of the top ten world music artists by the We are Listening International World of Music Awards for her interpretations of the music.

Robin Greenstein, a New York-based musician, received a federal CETA grant in the 1980s to collect and perform Sephardic Music under the guidance of the American Jewish Congress. Her mentor was Joe Elias, noted Sephardic singer from Brooklyn. She recorded residents of the Sephardic Home for the Aged, a nursing home in Coney Island, New York, singing songs from their childhood. The voices recorded included Victoria Hazan, a well known Sephardic singer who recorded many 78's in Judaeo-Spanish and Turkish from the 1930s and 1940s. Two Judaeo-Spanish songs can be found on her Songs of the Season holiday CD, released in 2010 on Windy Records.

German band In Extremo also recorded a version of the above-mentioned song Avram Avinu.

The Israeli-German folk band Baladino has released two albums that have songs with lyrics in Judaeo-Spanish.

== See also ==
- Haketia
- Jewish languages
- Judaism
- Judeo-Gascon
- Judaeo-Portuguese
- Judaeo-Romance languages
- Judaeo-Spanish Wikipedia
- Knaanic language
- Mozarabic language
- Los Serenos Sefarad, Judaeo-Spanish hip-hop
- Laura Papo Bohoreta
- Matilda Koen-Sarano
- Sephardi Jews
- Tetuani
- Cicurel family
- Pallache family
- Şalom, a Turkish newspaper with a Judaeo-Spanish page
- El Amaneser, a Turkish monthly newspaper in Judaeo-Spanish
- Aki Yerushalayim, an Israeli magazine in Judaeo-Spanish published 2–3 times a year
- Yiddish, language historically spoken by Ashkenazi Jews
- Judeo-Iranian languages, languages historically spoken by Mizrahi Jews in the former territories of the Persian Empire
