= Alliance Israélite Universelle =

Paris-based international Jewish organization

Alliance israélite universelle
- כל ישראל חברים
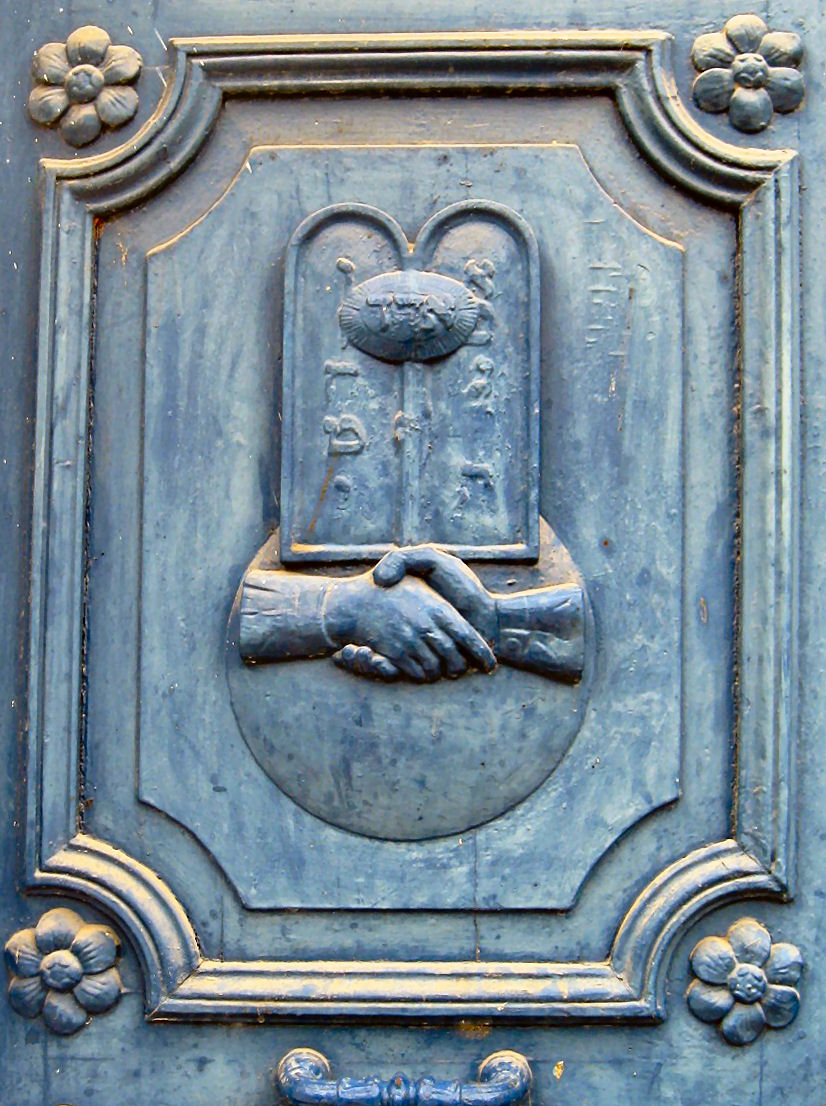
- Door detail of Mikveh Israel, 2009

- Founded: 1860; 166 years ago
- Headquarters: Paris, France
- Official language: French, Hebrew
- Key people: Mark Ayzenberg (president)
- Affiliations: Judaism
- Website: http://www.aiu.org/fr/

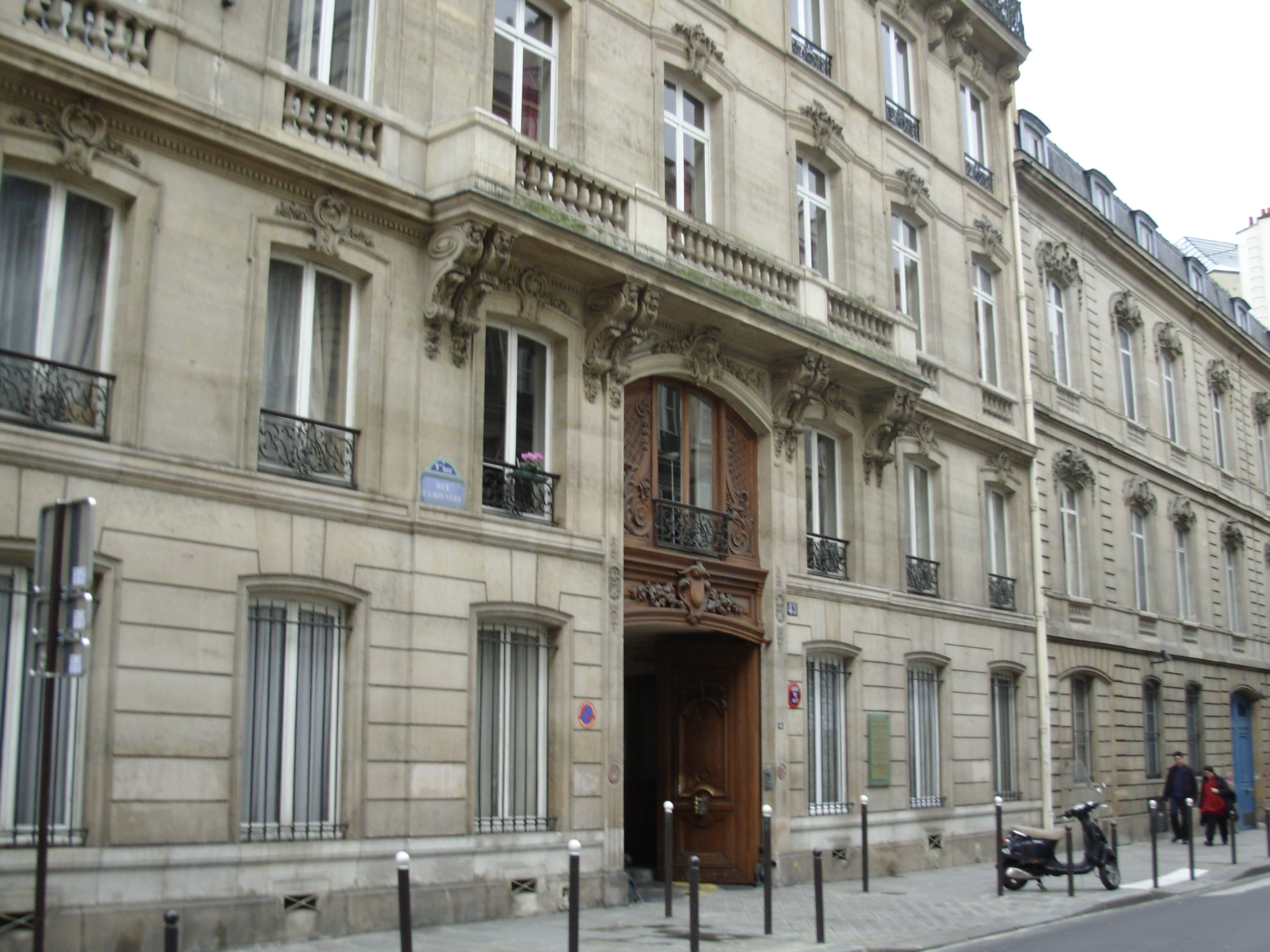
Entrance to the seat of the Société d'histoire des Juifs de Tunisie and the Alliance israélite universelle in Paris.

The Alliance israélite universelle (AIU; Hebrew: כל ישראל חברים; transl. "Universal Israelite Alliance") is a Paris-based international Jewish organization founded in 1860 with the purpose of safeguarding human rights for Jews around the world. It promotes the ideals of Jewish self-defense and self-sufficiency through education and professional development. The organization is noted for establishing French-language schools for Jewish children throughout the Mediterranean, Iran, and the former Ottoman Empire in the 19th and early 20th centuries.

The motto of the organization is the Jewish rabbinic injunction kol yisrael arevim ze laze (כל ישראל ערבים זה לזה), translated into French as tous les israélites sont solidaires les uns des autres (transl. "all Jews are responsible for one another").

== History ==
=== Background ===
In the mid-19th century, the status of Moroccan Jews, as well as Jews of "the Orient" more broadly, became a cause for European Jewish philanthropists, such as Moses Montefiore.

Following the sacking of Tetuan's Mellah (Jewish quarter) during the Hispano-Moroccan War (1859–1860), hundreds of Tetuani Jews fled to Cádiz and Gibraltar for refuge, and their plight received wide coverage in the European Jewish press. The Alliance Israélite Universelle established its first school in Tetuan in 1862, followed by more in other cities in Morocco.

=== Foundation ===
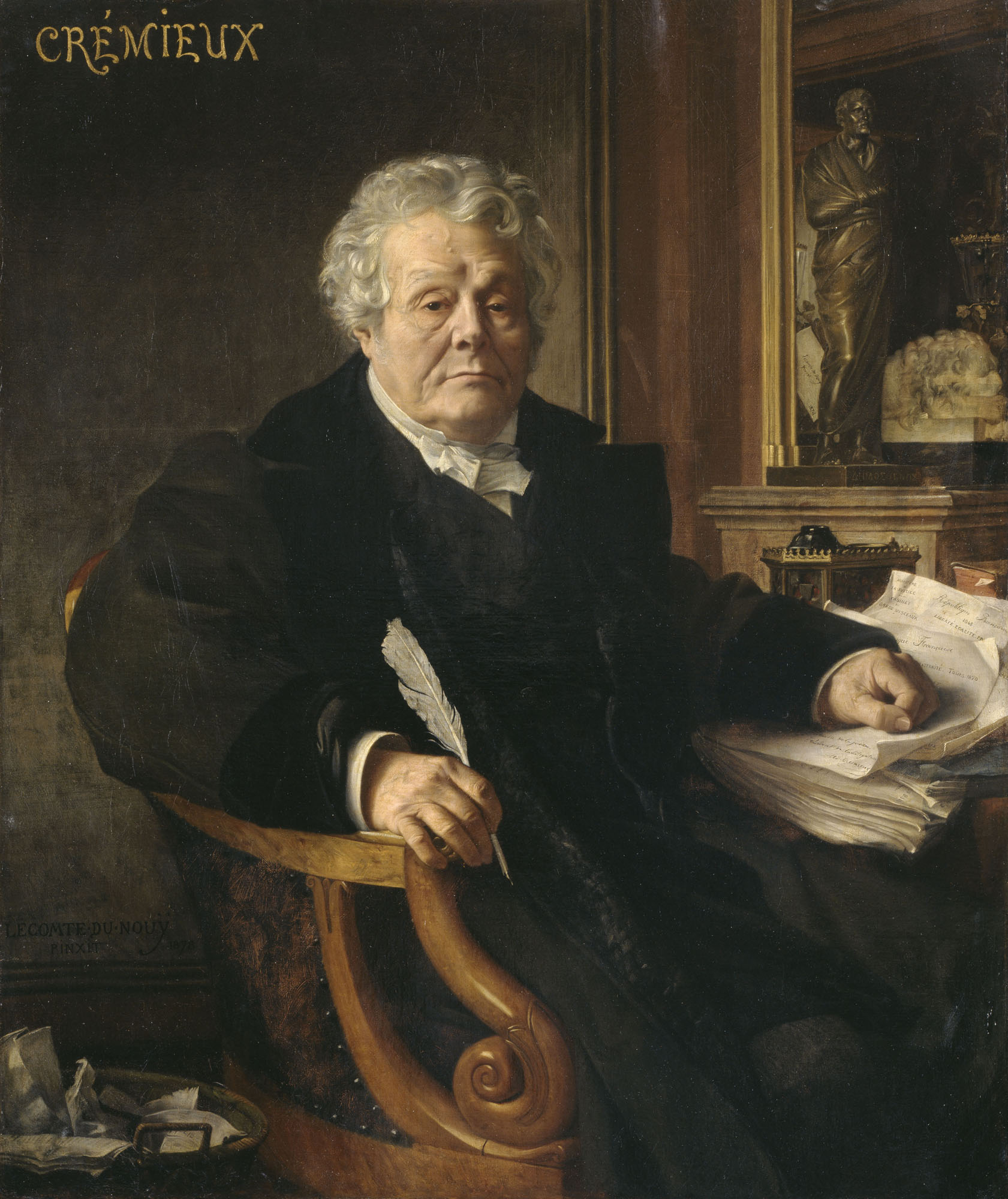
Adolphe Crémieux, an early supporter of the Alliance and its president 1863-67 and again 1868-80

In 1860, the Alliance Israélite Universelle embarked on a "mission civilisatrice" to advance the Jews of the Middle East through French education and culture. It was founded by a group of French Jews including Jules Carvallo, Isidore Cahen, Narcisse Leven (secretary of Adolphe Crémieux), Élie-Aristide Astruc, and Eugène Manuel May 1860 in Paris, and opened its first school in Tétouan, Morocco in 1862. The original members of the society were Jews, and by far the largest number of its members belong to that faith, but the association has enjoyed the sympathy and cooperation of many prominent Christians. As outlined in its prospectus, the program of the society included the emancipation of the Jews from oppressive and discriminatory laws, political disabilities, and defense of them in those countries where they were subjected to persecution.

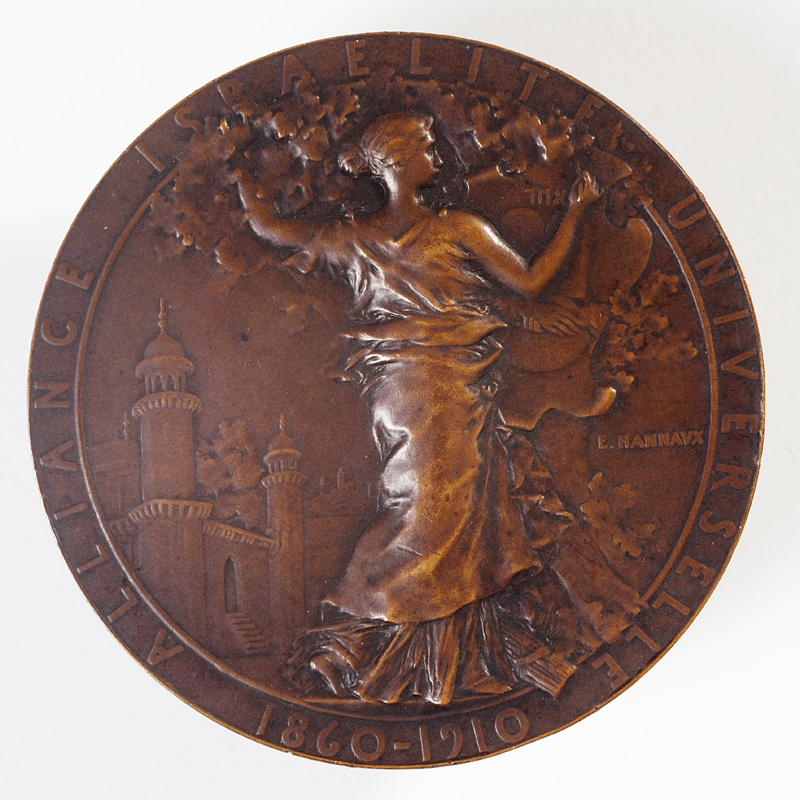
Medal by Emmanuel Hannaux for the 50th anniversary of the Alliance Israélite Universelle (1910) in the collection of the Jewish Museum of Switzerland, Basel (inv no. JMS 557): Female personification with the symbols of the Alliance. The other side shows Narcisse Leven in profile.

For the attainment of its objectives, the society proposed to carry on a campaign of education through the press and by the publication of works on the history and life of the Jews. In the beginning, however, the course of action adopted by the society for bringing relief to their oppressed brethren in other countries was to secure the intercession of friendly governments on their behalf. Thus, as early as 1867 the governments of France, Italy, Belgium, and the Netherlands made the renewal of existing treaties with Switzerland conditional upon that country's granting full civil and political rights to the Jews. In 1878, representatives of the Alliance laid the condition of the Jews in the Balkan Peninsula before the Congress of Berlin, as a result of which the Treaty of Berlin stipulated that in Romania, Serbia, and Bulgaria no discrimination should be made against any religion in the distribution of civil rights.

=== Schools ===
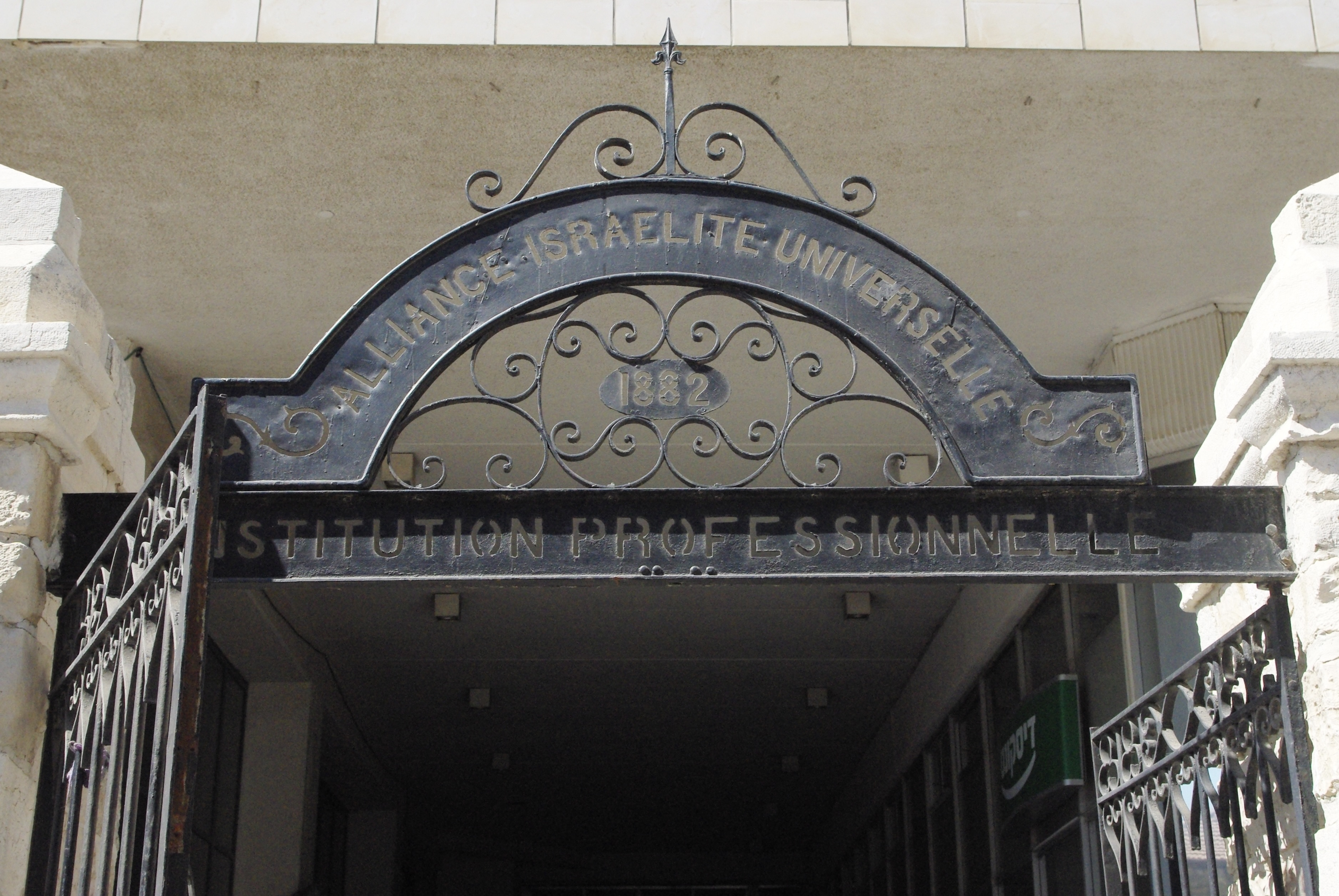
Gate of the school of Alliance israélite universelle (1882), on Jaffa Road in Jerusalem

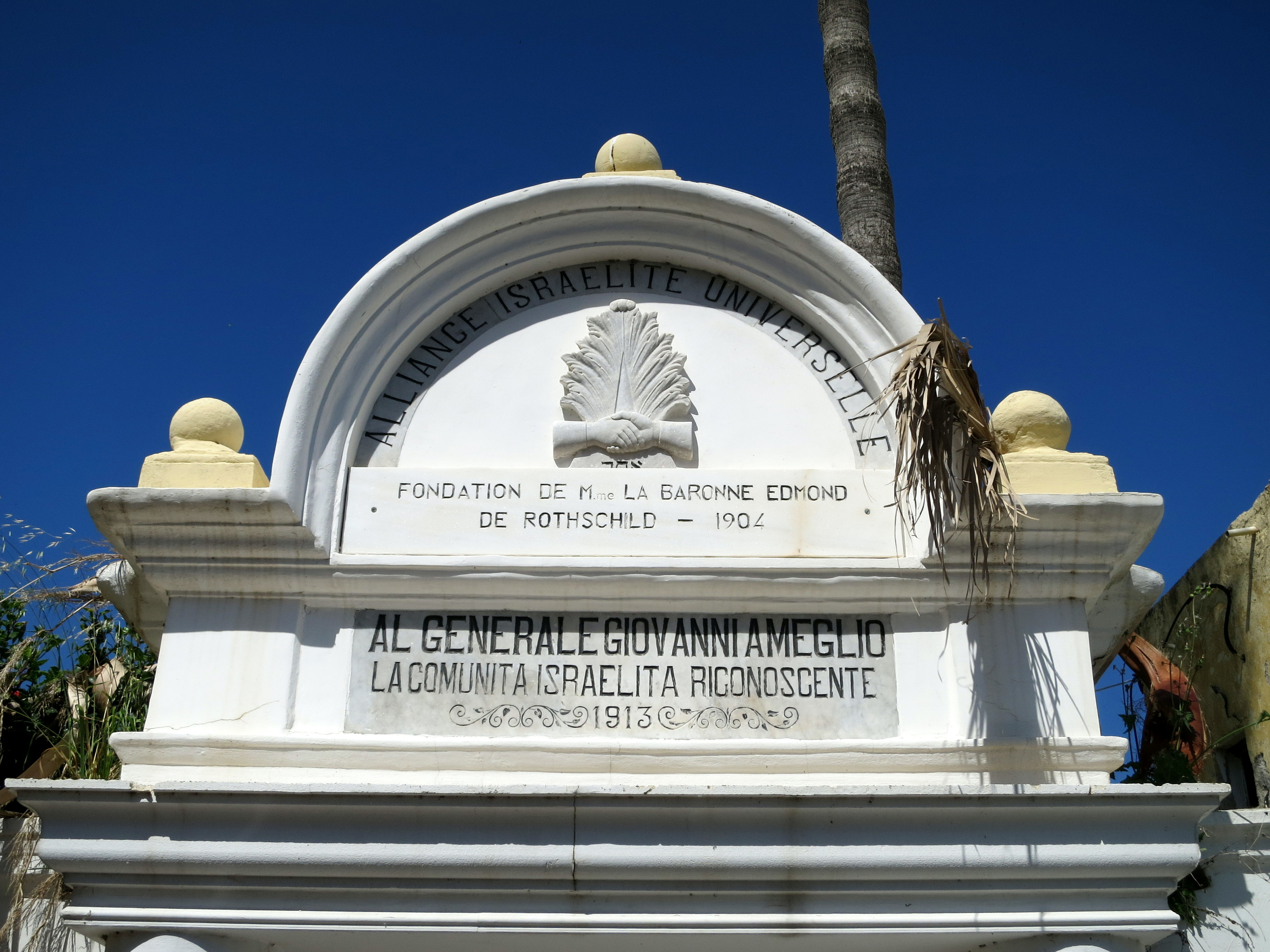
Inscriptions at the fountain in front of the former school of the Alliance Israélite Universelle in Rhodes

Over time, the activity of the Alliance became more focused on education and especially on improving the welfare of Jews. Two years after the first school was opened in Tétuan, an Alliance school opened in Baghdad in 1864. In 1870, Charles Netter, a founding member of Alliance israélite universelle, received a tract of land from the Ottoman Empire as a gift and opened the Mikveh Israel agricultural school, the first of a network of Jewish schools in Palestine before the establishment of the State of Israel. Over 60 Alliance schools operated in the Ottoman Middle East, Iran, and North Africa, providing Jewish children from poor families with formal elementary school and vocational training. Many of the teachers were educated at Alliance teacher training schools in Turkey and France.

The Alliance founded a free school in Jerusalem in 1868. This was followed by Mikveh Israel near Jaffa in 1870. In 1882 a secondary school for boys was established in Jerusalem. Amin al-Husseini was one of their pupils. The original building on Jaffa Road was demolished after 1967.

In 1903, the Zionist group Bnei Moshe was to be given a grant to open a school but the funding was withdrawn due to Beni Moshe's insistence that lessons should be in the Hebrew language. The following year the Alliance donated the property which later became Neve Tzedek (girls) and Gymnasia Hezliya (boys) schools. In 1906 the Alliance opened a secondary school for girls in Jerusalem.

By 1900, Alliance Israélite Universelle was operating 100 schools with a combined student population of 26,000. Its greatest efforts were concentrated in Morocco, Tunisia, and Turkey. After decades of teaching in French exclusively, the schools began teaching Hebrew to their students after the eleventh Zionist Congress insisted, amidst the modern revival of the Hebrew language, that it be included in the curriculum.

In 1912 the Alliance had 71 schools for boys and 44 for girls, with schools in Baghdad, Jerusalem, Tangier, Istanbul, Beirut, Cairo, Damascus and Salonica. For Jews, it was the chief provider of modern education.

A 1930 report found that there were 10 Jewish schools in Baghdad educating 7,182 children. Two of them were run by the Alliance israélite universelle. The boys' school had originally been the David Sassoon school founded in 1865. Albert Sassoon had given it to the Alliance in 1874. It contained 475 boys. Four languages were taught: Hebrew, Arabic, French and English. There were classes in the Sciences, Geography, and History. All were taught in French except for moral and religious studies which were in Hebrew. The Alliance School for Girls was established by Elly Kadoorie with 1177 pupils and with a similar syllabus.

As a result of the influence of the French-language schools, Judaeo-Spanish acquired many neologisms from French.

== Schools by country ==
=== Schools in Israel ===
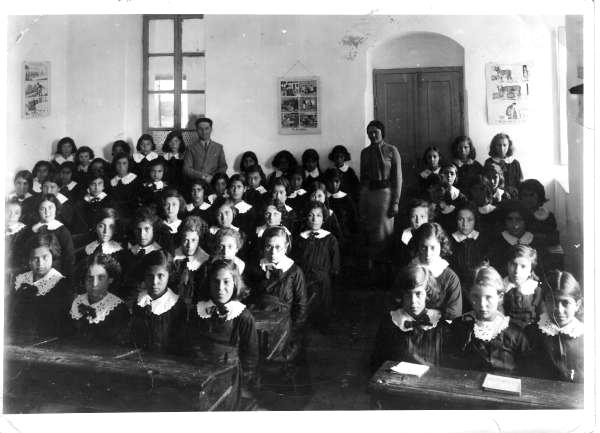
Alliance girls' school in Jerusalem, 1935

Alliance israélite universelle continues to operate dozens of schools and educational programs in Israel today. Historic schools include the Alliance High School in Tel Aviv, Alliance israélite universelle High School in Haifa, René Cassin High School, and the Braunschweig Conservative High School in Jerusalem. The network also includes the School for the Deaf in Jerusalem, in which deaf students, Jews, and Arabs, with various mental and physical disabilities, study together. The Mikve Israel Youth Village operates a state high school, a state-religious high school specializing in life and natural sciences, environmental sciences, and biotechnology; and a French-Israeli high school established in 2007 as a joint initiative of the Israeli and French governments.

=== Schools in Turkey ===
When French-medium schools operated by Alliance israélite universelle opened in the 1860s, the position of Judaeo-Spanish (Ladino) began to weaken in the Ottoman Empire areas. Judaeo-Spanish was not used as a language of instruction in any time in history, and was instead acquired though families; therefore Hebrew was perceived as the ethnic instructional language for Jewish people, used for religious reasons, in the empire. In time Judaeo-Spanish became perceived as a low status language, so people avoided learning it.

As time progressed, Judaeo-Spanish language and culture declined, and in 2017 writer Melis Alphan described Judaeo-Spanish as "dying in Turkey".

== Impact on girls and women ==
The Alliance israélite universelle (AIU) changed and shaped the roles and opportunities for women in North Africa. Before the establishment of the AIU, primarily girls from wealthy or rabbinical families received an education. Literacy and skilled training provided an opportunity for upward social mobility, especially to Jewish girls of underprivileged backgrounds who could not attain an education previously. Curricula featured foundational mathematics, such as arithmetic, and exposure to European subjects such as European geography and the French language. Additionally, girls received vocational training in fields such as needlework, sewing, bookkeeping, secretarial work, laboratory assistance, and industrial chemistry; this training promoted the economic independence of Jewish women in the region. Many North African women were also educated and trained as AIU teachers in France, returning thereafter to their countries of origin to teach.

Along with economic change, the AIU changed cultural norms for Jewish girls in the Maghreb as well. Primarily, the AIU lobbied to extend the typical marriage age from twelve to fifteen by 1948. This changing role of women led to controversy regarding the secularization of Jewish society through Western-style education.

== The AIU and secularization ==
The AIU, and more generally, the French colonization of swaths of North Africa, shifted education from the hands of rabbis and religious leaders to secular, European instructors. In Algeria, this shift resulted in a legal mandate: in 1845, a law required Jews of Algeria to be registered in French schools and to only attend a religious school as a supplement. Although the AIU did teach both secular and religious subjects, such as Hebrew and biblical history, religious leaders still questioned and lamented secularization.

Similarly, the AIU attempted to secularize the Jewish legal systems in North Africa. Before colonization, Jews in Morocco operated their legal system according to Halakha (Jewish law). In 1913, the AIU appealed to the French government to try the "indigenous [Jewish] inhabitants" in French courts instead of rabbinical tribunals.

== Political influence ==
Along with secularization, the AIU used its power to advocate the political assimilation of Maghrebi Jews into French society. AIU instructors were instrumental in the movement of naturalization for educated Moroccan Jews.

== Presidents ==
- Louis-Jean Koenigswarter (1860–1863)
- Adolphe Crémieux (1863–1867)
- Salomon Munk (1867–1867)
- Adolphe Crémieux (1868–1880)
- Salomon Hayum Goldschmidt (1882–1898)
- Narcisse Leven (1898–1915)
- Arnold Netter (1915–1920, interim)
- Sylvain Lévi (1920–1935)
- Arnold Netter (1936–1936)
- Georges Leven (1936–1941)
- René Cassin (1943–1976)
- Jules Braunschvig (1976–1985)
- Adolphe Steg (1985–2011)
- Marc Eisenberg (2011–)

== Notable alumni ==
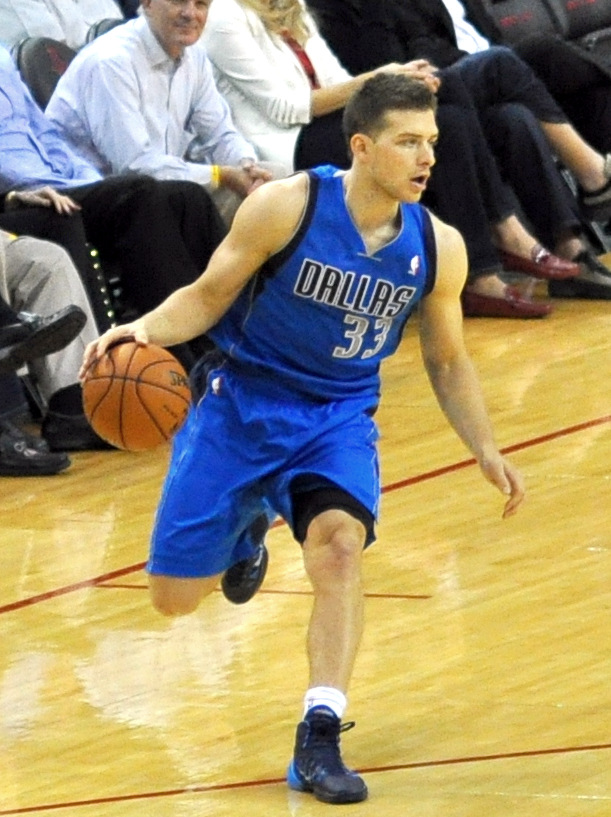
Gal Mekel

- Din Din Aviv, Israeli pop and folk singer
- Gal Mekel (born 1988), Israeli NBA basketball player
- Ori Yogev, Israeli businessman
- David Alliance, British-Iranian businessman
- Haroun Yashayaei, Former leader of Iran's Jewish community
- Amin al-Husseini, Palestinian Arab nationalist
- Avshalom Feinberg, Jewish spy
- Munis Tekinalp, Turkish nationalist
- Shalom Messas, Moroccan rabbi
- Mahmud Shevket Pasha, Ottoman general and reformer
- David Cazès, Jewish educator
- Yaakov Bentolila, Linguistics scholar
- José Benoliel, Moroccan writer
- Younes Hamami Lalehzar, Iranian Jewish community leader
- Sylvia Kedourie, English historian and writer
- Alberto Hemsi, Sephardic composer
- Sassoon Eskell, Iraqi statesman
- Israel Rokach, Former mayor of Tel Aviv
- Na'aman Belkind, Jewish spy
- Haim Moussa Douek, Last chief rabbi of Egypt
- Vitalis Danon, Rabbi poet
- Jack M. Sasson, Jewish studies scholar
- Itzhak Levanon, Israeli diplomat
- Avi Toledano, Israeli singer
- Ali Lmrabet, Moroccan journalist
- Ribhi Kamal, Palestinian educator
- Oded Menashe, Israeli actor.

== See also ==
- Education in Israel
- France-Israel relations
- Jews of France
- Or Yehuda Agriculture School
