= Narcisse Leven =

Canadian lawyer (1833–1915)

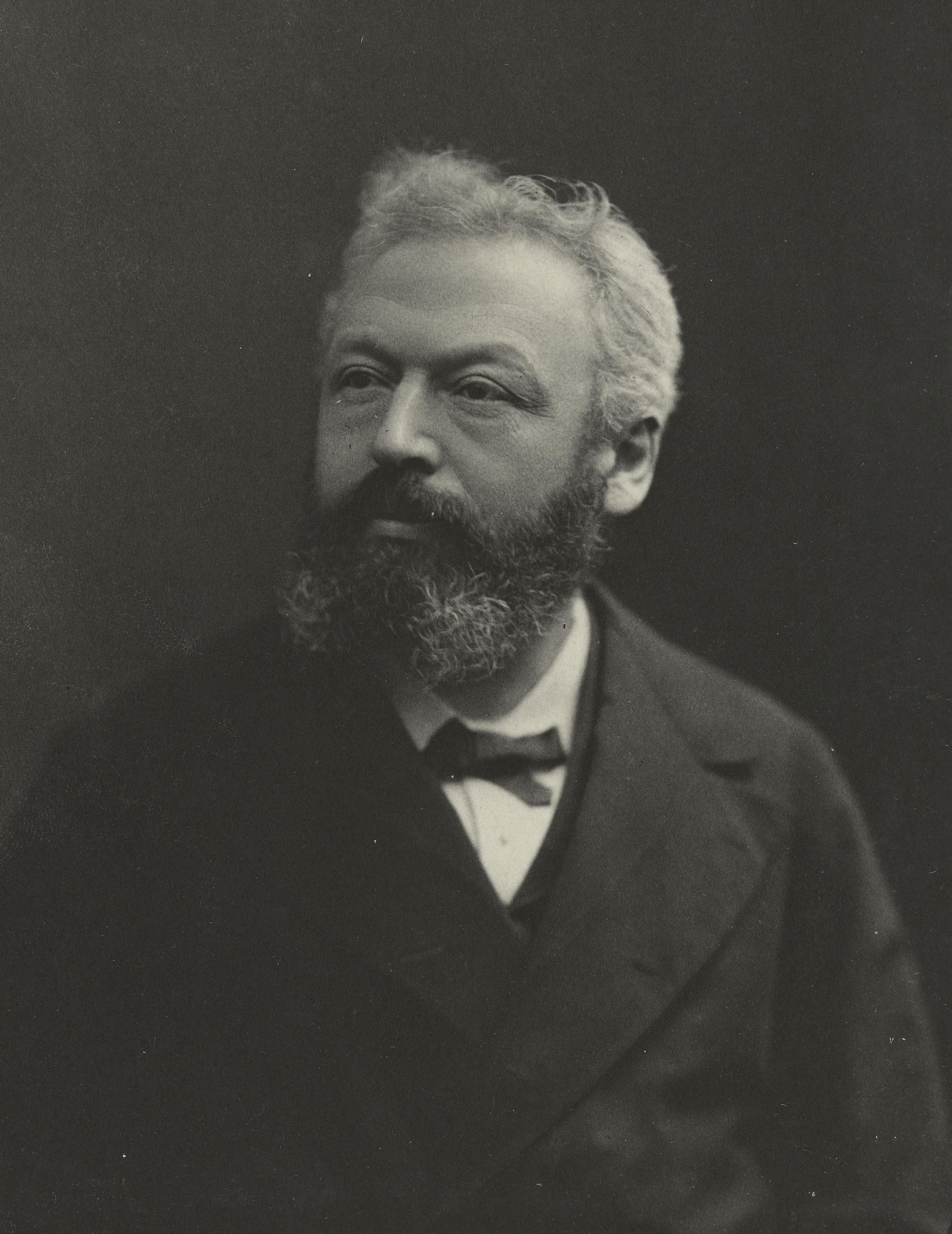
- Born: 15 October 1833; Uerdingen, Germany
- Died: January 6, 1915 (aged 81)
- Occupation: Lawyer

Narcisse Leven (15 October 1833 – 6 January 1915) was a Jewish French lawyer.

== Biography ==
Leven was born on 15 October 1833 in Uerdingen, Germany,

He was one of the original founders of the Alliance israélite universelle (AIU). He was its general secretary from 1863 to 1883, its vice-president from 1883 to 1898, and its president beginning in 1898.

Narcisse, Manitoba, Canada was also named after Leven, who was then the president of the Jewish Colonization Association, by the residents of Bender Hamlet, a Jewish farm colony located 2 km east of Narcisse.
