= Yogev =

Yogev (Hebrew: יוֹגֵב) is both a given name and a surname meaning "husbandman, husbander; farmer".

Notable people with the name include:

- Yogev Ben Simon (born 1986), Israeli footballer
- Yogev Hazuharoui (born 1991, born Yogev Hazuharoui Lerman), Israeli footballer
- Yogev Ohayon (born 1987), Israeli basketball player
- Moti Yogev (born 1956), born Mordechai Vagenburg), Israeli politician
- Ori Yogev (born 1960), Israeli businessman
