= Simcha Friedman =

Israeli politician (1911–1990)

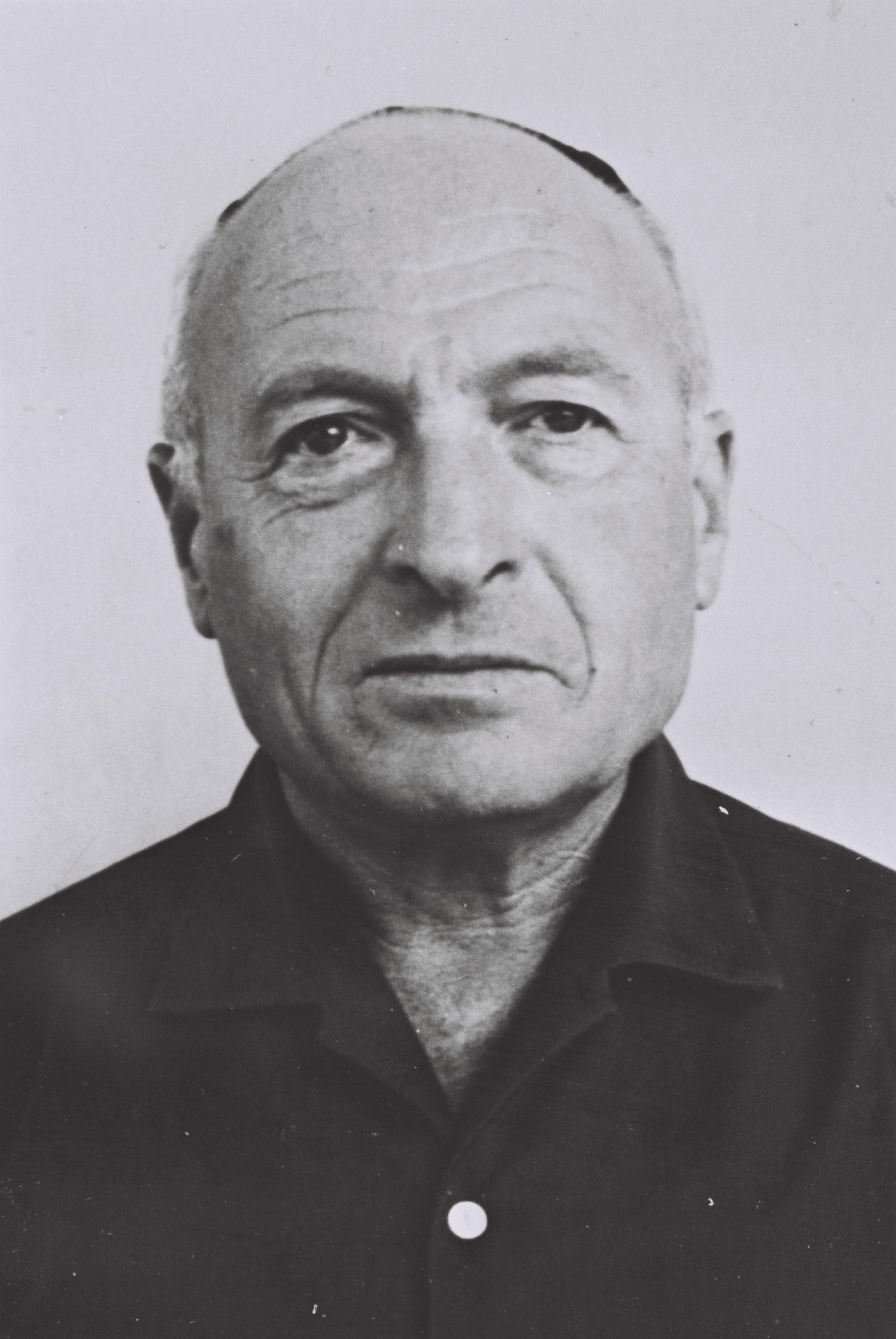
- Friedman in 1969

Faction represented in the Knesset
- 1969–1974: National Religious Party
- 1975–1977: National Religious Party

Personal details
- Born: 1911 Driesendorf, Austria-Hungary
- Died: 5 January 1990 (aged 78–79)

Simcha Friedman (Hebrew: שמחה פרידמן; 1911 – 5 January 1990) was an Israeli rabbi, educator and politician who served as a member of the Knesset for the National Religious Party in two spells between 1969 and 1977.

== Biography ==
Born in Driesendorf in Bohemia, Austria-Hungary (now Střížov in the Czech Republic) in 1911, Friedman moved to Nuremberg with his family at a young age. He studied at a rabbinical seminary and at the Humboldt University of Berlin. He taught at a Jewish school between 1935 and 1938, before emigrating to Mandatory Palestine in 1939, where he taught at Mikveh Israel Agricultural school between 1939 and 1943. In 1943 he joined kibbutz Tirat Zvi, and began working as a teacher and headmaster within the Religious Kibbutz Movement education system. Between 1967 and 1967 he was an educational emissary to New York City, before returning to Israel to work as a religious high school supervisor in the Northern District.

In 1969 he was elected to the Knesset on the National Religious Party list. Although he lost his seat in the 1973 elections, he returned to the Knesset on 2 July 1975 as a replacement for the deceased Michael Hasani. In the same year he began lecturing in the Talmud department at Bar-Ilan University. He lost his seat in the 1977 elections, and died in 1990.
