= David Cazès =

Moroccan-Jewish educator (1851–1913)

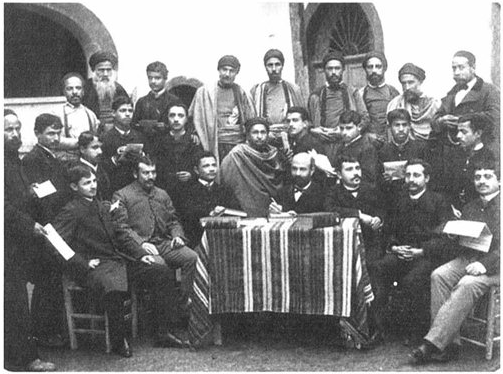
- Educator David Cazes (beyond the desk) and a group of teachers and rabbis, Tunis, 1887.
- Born: 1851; Tétouan, Morocco
- Died: 1913 (aged 61–62)
- Education: Alliance Israélite Universelle
- Occupations: Writer; educator
- Writing career
- Years active: 1869–1913
- Subject: Jewish diaspora

David Cazès (1851, Tétouan, Morocco – 1913) was a Moroccan Jewish educator and writer.

== Early life ==
Sent to Paris in his early youth, Cazès was educated by the Alliance Israélite Universelle, and at the age of 18 was commissioned to establish and direct several primary schools in the East; namely, at Volos in Thessaly (1869), at Smyrna (1873), and at Tunis (February 1878–1893). In each of these places he took part also in the organization of the Jewish communities. At Tunis, especially the official organization of Judaism by the government of the French protectorate, was his work. There he was founder and principal of several elementary schools.

In 1893 he moved to Buenos Aires, Argentina, serving as a member of the administrative committee of the colonization fund founded by Baron Maurice de Hirsch under the name of the Jewish Colonization Association.

== Career ==
In 1878, Cazès was appointed an officer of the Order of Nichan Iftikhar of Tunis. The French government in 1886 awarded him academic laurels, and in 1889 the rosette of Chevalier of the Legion of Honour.

He was the author of many works regarding the Jewish diaspora in Northern Africa, including:

- Cazès, David (1888). Essai sur l'histoire des Israélites de Tunisie : depuis les temps les plus reculés jusqu'a l'établissement du protectorat de la France en Tunisie [Essay on the history of the Israelites of Tunisia: from the earliest times to the establishment of the French protectorate in Tunisia] (in French). Paris: Librairie Armand Durlacher. OCLC 7711661. OL 20602266M.
- Cazès, David (1893). Notes Bibliographiques sur la Littérature Juives-Tunisienne [Bibliographical Notes on Jewish-Tunisian Literature] (in French). Tunis: Imprimerie Intérnationale.
- Halévy, Fabian S.; Cazès, David (1907). Ḥizayon beʿad yalde bet ha-sefer [A vision for schoolchildren] (in Hebrew). OCLC 1300226464.

The latter book was one which gave an exact picture of the literary life of the Jews of Tunis. He also contributed a large number of articles to the Revue des Etudes Juives and other Jewish periodicals.

== Sources ==
- Joseph Tolédano, La Saga des Familles les Juifs du Maroc et Leurs Noms, 1983
