= Arnold Netter =

French physician

Juste Arnold Netter
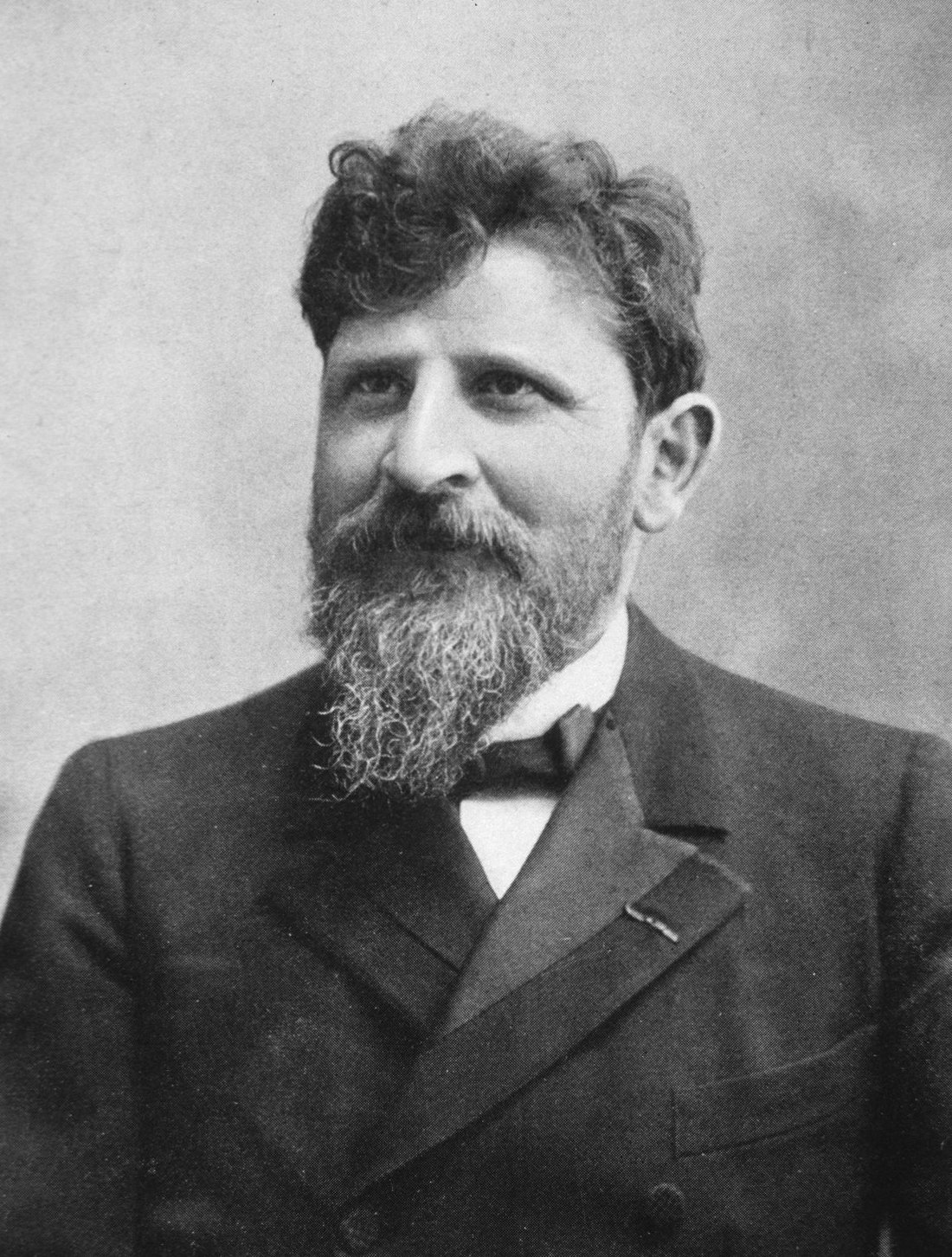
- Born: September 20, 1855; Strasbourg, France
- Died: March 1, 1936 (aged 80); Paris, France
- Occupations: Physician, hygienist, pediatrician, bacteriologist, biologist
- Known for: Work on cerebrospinal meningitis, poliomyelitis, pneumococcal infections, encephalitis, shingles
- Spouse: Esther Jeanne Lang
- Children: Henri Netter, Léon Netter, Marthe Netter
- Relatives: Charles Netter (uncle)
- Awards: Gold medal of the AP-HP (1882)
- Honors: Knight of the Legion of Honour (1892), Officer (1912), Commander (1921), Grand Officer (1928)

Juste Arnold Netter (20 September 1855 – 1 March 1936) was a physician, hygienist, pediatrician, bacteriologist, and biologist from France. He received the gold medal of the AP-HP in 1882 and was a professor at the faculty of medicine. He is known for his work on cerebrospinal meningitis, poliomyelitis, pneumococcal infections, encephalitis, and shingles. He was among the first to apply bacteriology to clinical medicine.

== Biography ==
Arnold Netter was born on 20 September 1855 in Strasbourg. He was nephew of Charles Netter and son of doctor Léon Netter. Married to Esther Jeanne Lang, daughter of manufacturer Benoît Baruch Lang (Les Fils d'Emanuel Lang), he was the father of doctor Henri Netter (1895–1946), lawyer Léon Netter (1897–1987), and Marthe Netter (1892–1940), wife of publisher René Lisbonne.

He pursued a medical career, becoming an external at the Paris hospitals in 1875, intern in 1877, doctor of medicine in 1883, head of clinic in 1884, hospital physician in 1888, and associate professor at the Faculty of Medicine of Paris in 1889. He served as head of the pediatrics department at Hôpital Trousseau from 1905 to 1920. He was elected member of the Superior Council of Public Health of France in 1898, and member of the Academy of Medicine in 1904.

He supported Captain Alfred Dreyfus and Bernard Lazare. Close to Raymond Poincaré, he also played a major role in the training of early 20th-century medical professors such as Robert Debré (memoir by Michel Debré). After World War I, he was the first to characterize the Spanish flu in a communication to the Academy of Medicine.

Nephew of Charles Netter, one of the founders of the Alliance israélite universelle (AIU), he joined the AIU early on and served on its Central Committee. He was a member, then vice-president, and acting president from 1915 to 1920, and was named president shortly before his death.

On 1 March 1936, he experienced a malaise at the end of his presentation on "fixed abscess" during the 20th of medical assizes at the Hôtel Dieu. He was taken to his home on Boulevard Saint-Germain, where he died.

== Honors and distinctions ==
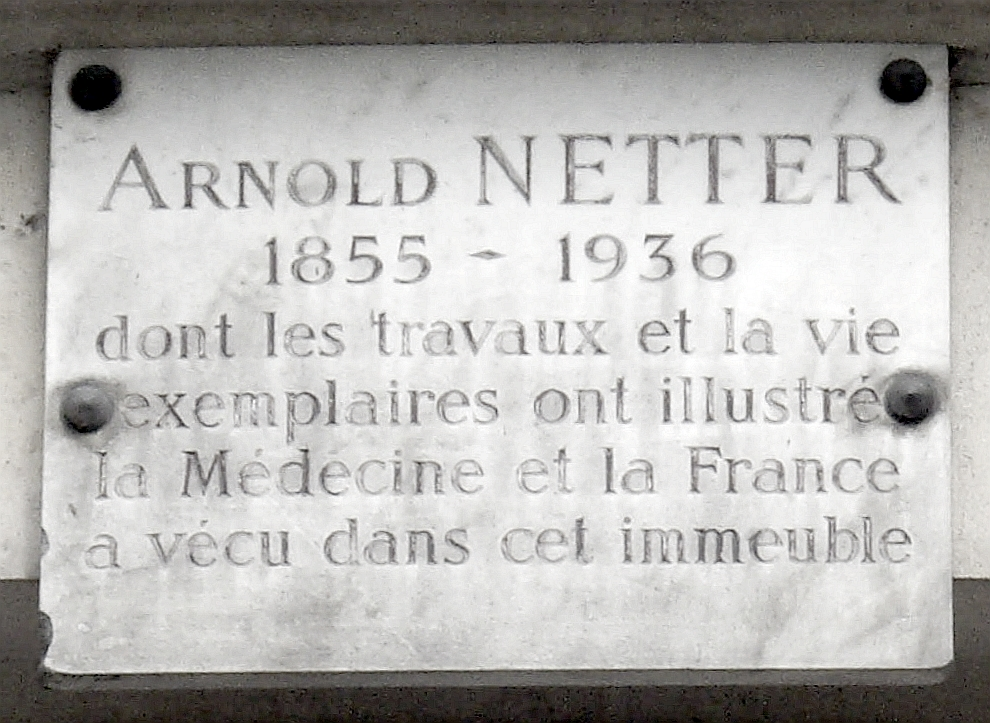
Plaque at 104 Boulevard Saint-Germain (6th arrondissement of Paris), where he lived.

An avenue in the 12th arrondissement of Paris as well as hospital services bear his name. In Strasbourg, his hometown, a rue du Docteur-Netter connects rue du Docteur-Schaffner to rue René-Laënnec in a recent district at Montagne Verte.

He was named knight of the Legion of Honour in 1892, officer in 1912, commander in 1921, and grand officer in 1928.

== See also ==
=== Bibliography ===
- Robert Weyl, "Juste Arnold Netter", in Nouveau dictionnaire de biographie alsacienne, vol. 28, p. 2826
- Arnold Netter: "Use of colloidal silver in infectious diseases; Colloidal silver and its therapeutic applications", in Colloidal Silver; Nielrow Éditions, Dijon 2018; ISBN 978-2-9559619-6-4
