= Akiva Ettinger =

Russian agronomist and Zionist leader (1872–1945)

- עקיבא יעקב אטינגר
- Born: Akiva Jacob Ettinger; 1872; Vitebsk, Belorussia
- Died: 1945 (aged 72–73); Jerusalem, British Mandate of Palestine
- Occupations: Agronomist, Director General of the Jewish Colonization Association

Akiva Jacob Ettinger (Hebrew: עקיבא יעקב אטינגר; 1872 - 1945) was an agronomist and an early Zionist leader who advocated for settlement in Ottoman Palestine. He led the Jewish National Fund's land purchases in Palestine and functioned as director general of the Jewish Colonization Association in South Russia, Brazil, and Argentina.

== Early life ==
Ettinger was born in Vitebsk, Belorussia and was a descendant of Akiva Eiger. He received a degree in agriculture from Saint Petersburg University.

== Zionist activism ==
In 1898, he participated in an inquiry into the conditions facing Jewish farmers in southern Russia as a representative of the Jewish Colonization Association (ICA). Following this, he was requested to create a Jewish model farm in Bessarabia. In 1902, the Odessa Committee of Hovevei Zion sent Ettinger and Ahad HaAm to look into the condition of Jewish settlements.

In 1918, Ettinger served as an advisor on settlement issues during the Balfour Declaration negotiations in London and wrote the memorandum, “Palestine after the War: Proposals for Administration and Development.”

After relocating to the British Mandate of Palestine in 1918, Ettinger led the Zionist Organization's Department of Agricultural Settlement until 1924. Beginning in 1919, he established the village Kiryat Anavim to serve as a model for hill settlements.

== Death ==
Akiva Ettinger died in 1945, and was buried in Kiryat Anavim.
