= Yaakov Bentolila =

Moroccan-Israeli philologist and professor of Hebrew

- יעקב בן-טולילה
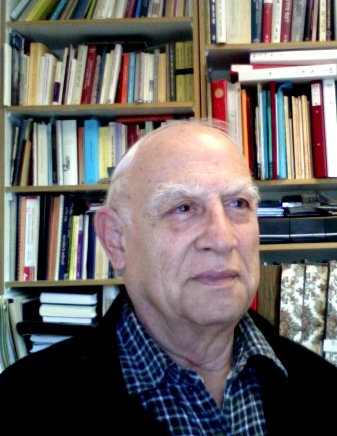
- Born: 1935 (age 90–91); Tétouan, Spanish protectorate of Morocco
- Occupation: Philologist
- Parent(s): Vidal and Mercedes Bentolila

Academic background
- Education: Alliance Israélite Universelle

Academic work
- Main interests: Ladino

Yaakov Bentolila (Hebrew: יעקב בן-טולילה; born 1935) is an Israeli philologist, a professor of Hebrew language at Ben Gurion University in Beersheba, and a member of the Hebrew Language Academy since 2004.

== Biography ==
Bentolila was born in 1935 to Vidal and Mercedes Bentolila, a Sephardic Jewish family. He studied at a school of the Alliance Israélite Universelle and later at the Spanish Lyceum in Tétouan. In 1950, he moved to France, and made Aliyah a year later, arriving in Yavne. Upon reaching adulthood, he served in the Israel Defense Forces under the Nahal Brigade.

His parents immigrated to Israel in 1956, along with his two brothers. They passed through an immigration center to Kiryat Gat, where Bentolila worked as an electrician. In 1958, he began working with Bnei Akiva, travelling back to Morocco, France, and other Maghrebi countries. While working for Bnei Akiva, he met his wife, a French Jew of Hungarian origin. They married in Strasbourg in 1961.

Bentolila was the head of the Hebrew Language Department at Ben-Gurion University from 1974 to 1992. Concurrently, he conducted research at the Center for Jewish Studies at Harvard, and became well known among researchers studying Haketia and Judeo-Spanish culture of North Africa.

== Works ==
- Bentolila, Yaakov (1989). A French-Italian Tradition of Post-Biblical Hebrew [IN HEBREW]. [SERIES]: Publications of The Hebrew University Language Traditions Project / XIV. Beer Sheva: Ben-Gurion University of the Negev Press.
- Bentolila, Yaakov (Dec 1996). "Un message crypté dans l'inscription synagogale de Haguenau". ResearchGate.
- Ben-Tolila, Yaakov (1997). Šay lHadasah: meḥqariym balašwn haʿibriyt wbilšwnwt haYhwdiym. ʾEšel Bʾer-Šebaʿ (in Hebrew). Ben Gurion university of the Negev. Bʾer-Šebaʿ: Hwṣ. haspariym šel ʾWniybersiyṭat Ben-Gwrywn baNegeb. ISBN 978-965-342-664-1.
- Bentolila, Yaakov (Jan 2002). "From Written to Oral — Canonical Literature as Reflected in Proverbs / מן הכתב אל הפה: גלגולה של ספרות קאנונית בפתגמים". Researchgate.
- Haketia: The Judeo-Spanish of North Africa Los Muestros N°61, (December 2005)
- Bentolila, Yaakov; Alexander, Tamar (2008). איל פריזינטי (in Hebrew). Vol. 2–4. Negev: Universidad Ben-Gurion del Negev. ISBN 9789659116416.
- La palabra en su hora es oro, co-written with Tamar Alexander (2009)
- Alexander, Tamar; Bentolila, Yaakov; Şarhon, Karen Gerson; Papo, Eliezer (2009). "'Maria, sister of Aaron, play your tambourine': Music in the Lives of Crypto-Jewish Women in Portugal". El Prezente: Studies in Sephardic Culture. 3: 293–314. ISBN 978-965-91164-2-3.
- Bentolila, Yaakov (2010). Studies in the history and culture of North African Jewry : proceedings of the symposium at Yale University, April 25, 2010. New Haven: Program in Judaic Studies. ISBN 9789654810418.
- Bentolila, Yaakov; Alexander, Tamar (Dec 2010). "Adolescence and the Period of Apprenticeship among the Western Sephardim in the Seventeenth Century". ResearchGate.
- Bentolila, Yaakov; Center, Gaon (2015-01-01). "Yaakov Bentolila, "Cómo se trokan los proverbiosˮ, El Prezente 8-9 / Mikan 15, III (2015), pp. 1-9".
- Alexander, Tamar; Bentolila, Yaakov (2015), "Judeo-Spanish Haketic Proverbs from Northern Morocco: Sources and Studies", in Grandl, Christian; McKenna, Kevin J. (eds.), Bis dat, qui cito dat, Peter Lang Publishing Inc., pp. 17–28, ISBN 978-3-631-64872-8
- Bentolila, Yaakov (2016). Diccionario del elemento hebreo en la haketía [Dictionary of Hebrew elements in Haketia] (in Spanish). Cordoba: UCOPress. ISBN 978-8499272009.
- THE ON THE MEANING OF PERSONAL NAMES IN HAKITIC PROVERBS, co-written with Tamar Alexander
- Bentolila, Yaakov. "El Prezente Studies in Sephardic Culture The National Authority for Ladino and its Culture".
- Bentolila, Yaakov. "Une taqqana tétouanaise de 1822". www.academia.edu.<
- Bentolila, Yaakov. "Bilingualism in a Moroccan Settlement in the South of Israel 1". www.academia.edu.
- Bentolila, Yaakov. "La résurrection d'une langue morte : le cas de l'hébreu moderne". www.academia.edu.
