= Mikveh Israel =

Youth village in Tel Aviv, Israel

Mikveh Israel: מִקְוֵה יִשְׂרָאֵל (Hebrew)
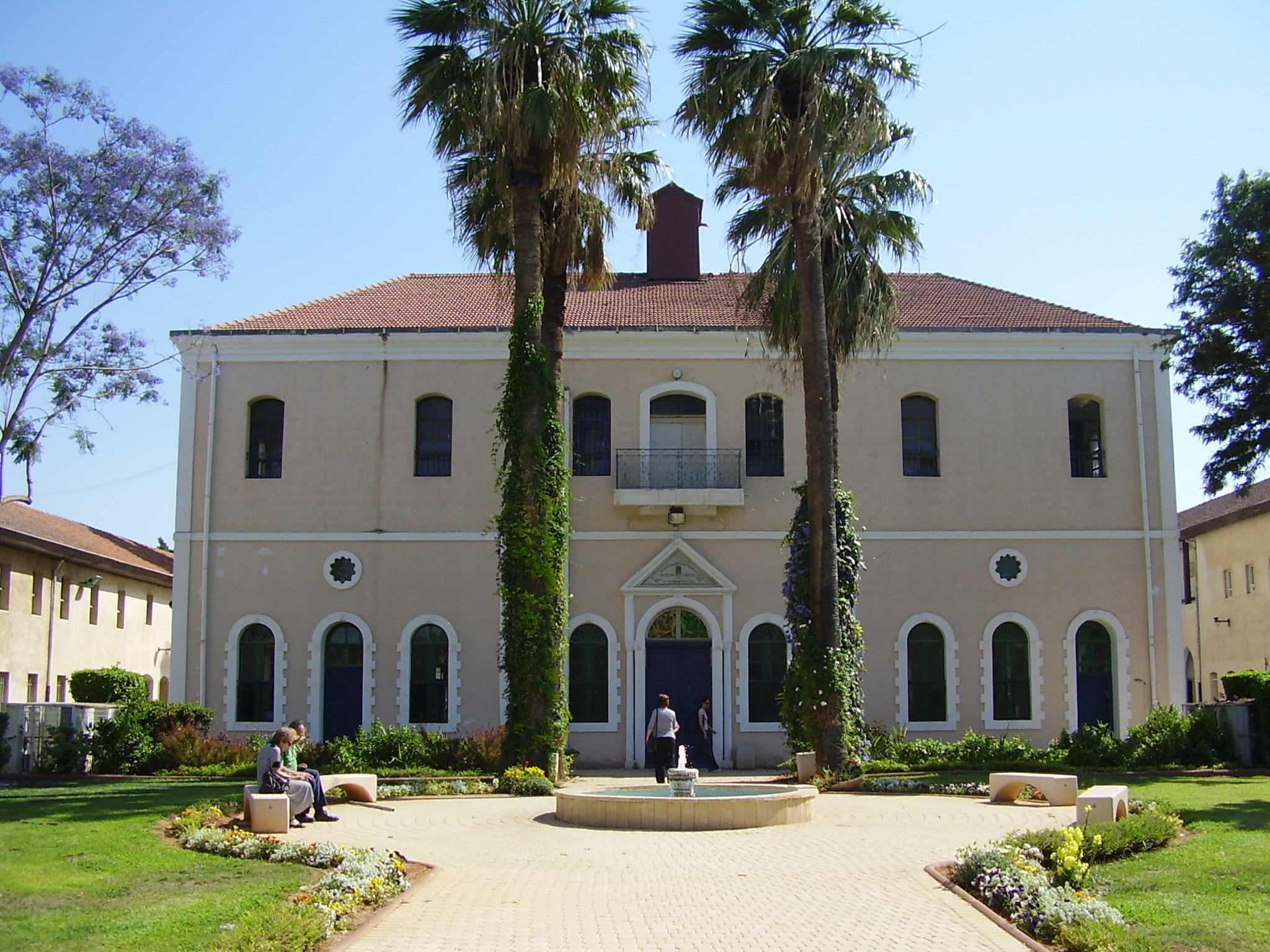
- Mikveh Israel
- Etymology: Hope of Israel
- Location within Central Israel Location within Israel
- Coordinates: 32°01′45″N 34°46′53″E
- Country: Israel
- District: Tel Aviv
- Founded: 1870
- Founder: Charles Netter
- Population (2024): 423
- Website: mikveisrael.org.il

Mikveh Israel (Hebrew: מִקְוֵה יִשְׂרָאֵל, lit. 'Hope of Israel') is a youth village and boarding school in the Tel Aviv District of central Israel, established in 1870. It was the first Jewish agricultural school in what is now Israel and indeed the first modern Jewish settlement in under the Ottoman Empire rule outside of Jerusalem, heralding a new era in the history of the region. In 2024 it had a population of 423.

== History ==
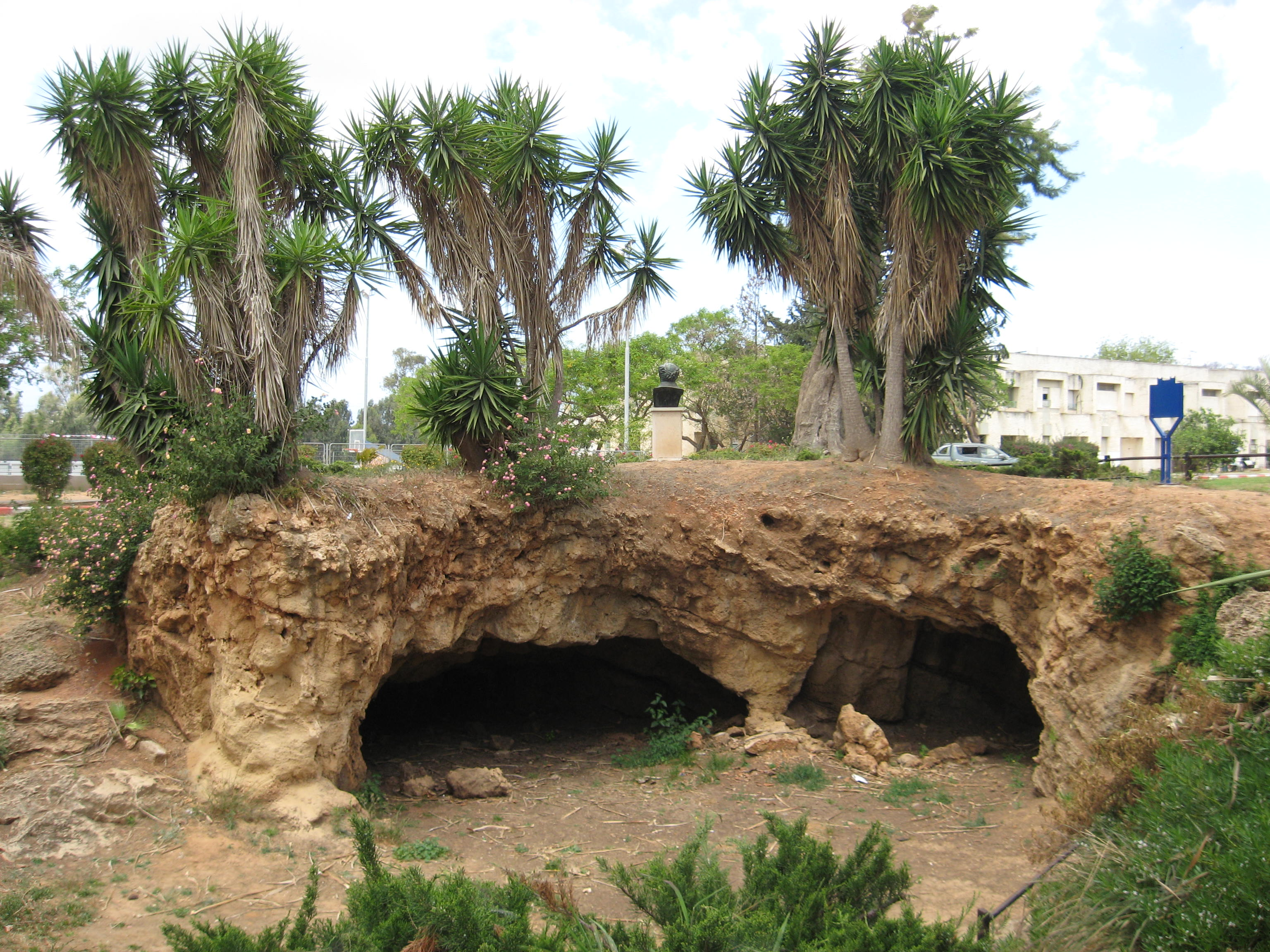
Cave of Charles (Yaakov) Netter, the founder and first director of the Mikveh Israel agricultural school

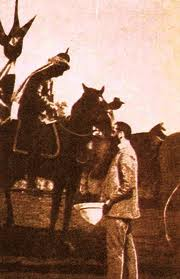
Theodor Herzl met the German Emperor Wilhelm II at the main entrance of Mikveh Israel

Mikveh Israel was founded in the Mutasarrifate of Jerusalem, Ottoman Empire in April 1870 by Charles Netter, an emissary of the French organization Alliance Israélite Universelle, aiming to be an educational institution where young Jews could learn agriculture and leave to establish villages and settlements all over the country and to make the desert blossom. It was established on a tract of land southeast of Jaffa leased from the Ottoman Sultan, who allocated 750 acres (3.0 km^{2}) to the project. The name is taken from two passages in the Book of Jeremiah, Jeremiah 14:8 and 17:13, and was proposed by Wolf Grinstein, one of the school's first students, who later taught there.

Netter, the first headmaster, introduced new methods of agricultural training, with Baron Edmond James de Rothschild contributing to the upkeep of the school. Netter pioneered progressive educational methods and a new way of life and agricultural training for the future farmers of this land. There were only about 20,000 Jews in the country at that time, mostly established in the traditional cities of Judaism: Jerusalem, Tiberias, Safed, and Hebron.

Beginning in the early 1880's the school was used to train the first group of farm workers in order to prepare an eventual self-sustaining village in the area. The project was mostly funded by the French Baron de Rothschild, who would only purchase the land on loan, after the farmers had proven that they were properly trained. The men were each established farm workers who were from the Russian village of Pavaluka, and on November 7, 1883, the ten chosen farmers had moved to Palestine and plowed the first rows of earth, at what was known as Rishon le-Zion, or first to Zion, in English.

In 1898, Theodor Herzl met the German Emperor Wilhelm II at the main entrance of Mikveh Israel during Herzl's only visit to Eretz Yisrael. The meeting, a PR event engineered by Herzl to publicly meet the Kaiser, was misinterpreted by the world media as a legitimization of Herzl and Zionism by Germany. Today, entrance to the school grounds is via the city of Holon.

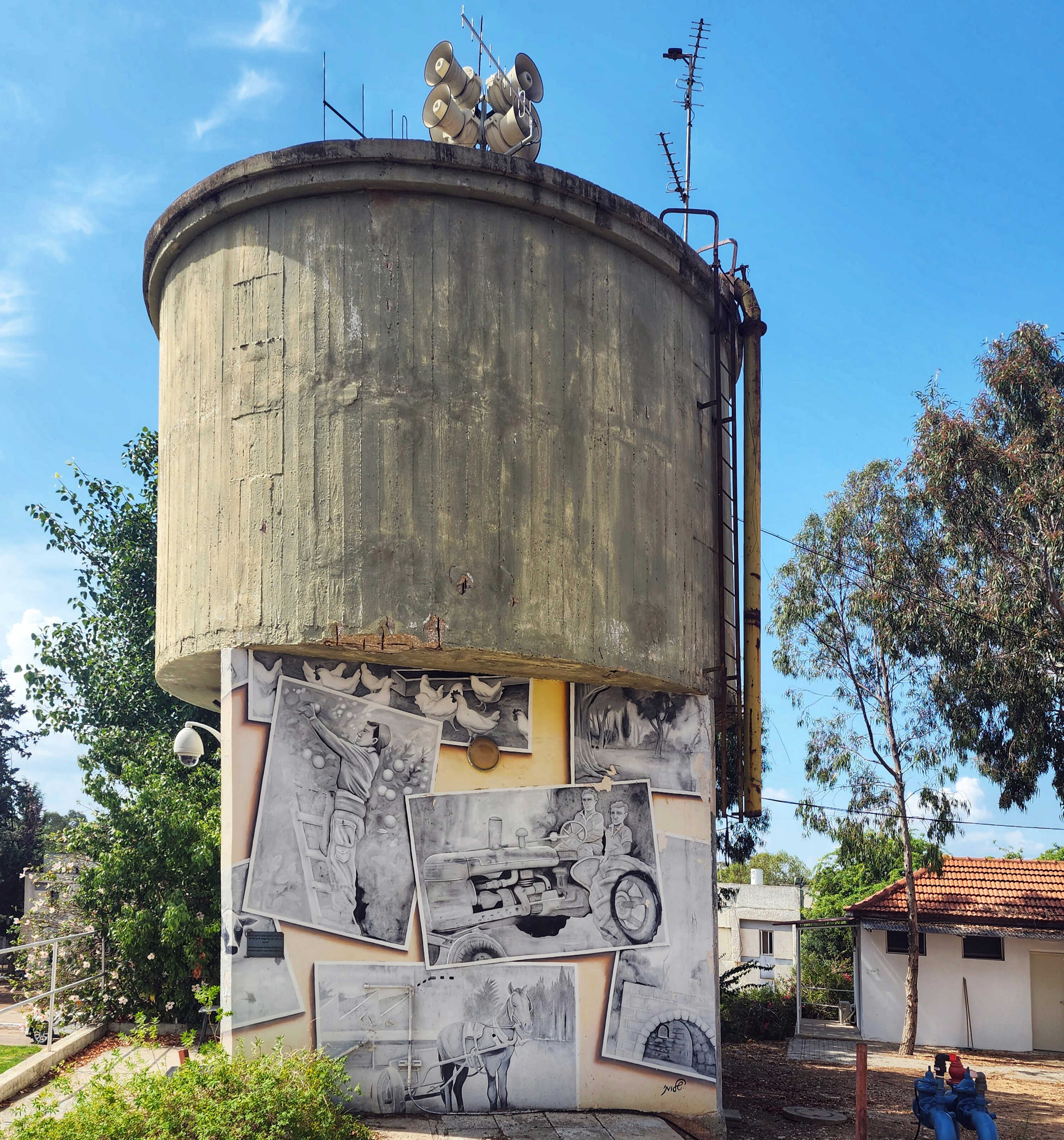
A water tower

For many decades (until the establishment of the Volcani Center and the Faculty of Agriculture in Rehovot) the school served as the research center for the country. Their teachers wrote the first study books about agriculture and served as field advisors. Most of the agricultural know-how of the first 50 years was collected and published by Mikve Israel. After finishing their studies, the thousands of graduates left Mikve Israel to start agricultural settlements of all kinds, villages and kibbutzim, moshavim, farms and agricultural schools; or serving in management positions; or continued their agricultural studies in institutions of higher learning and filling positions in research and development, the export branches, marketing and agricultural management. In 1938–1939, at the request of the Youth Aliyah, a section for religious youth was built to house the religious and traditional youngsters who fled western Europe just before the start of the Holocaust.

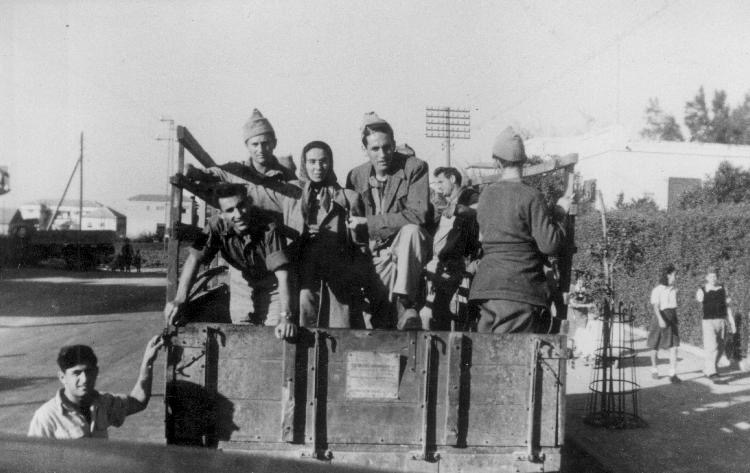
Members of Palmach based in Mikveh-Israel, 1948

== Geography ==
Mikve Israel is located on a strategic crosspoint on the road connecting Tel Aviv to Jerusalem. Part of the only green space in the Tel Aviv District, it has been used as an organizing point for the convoys and up to the Gulf War.

== Education ==
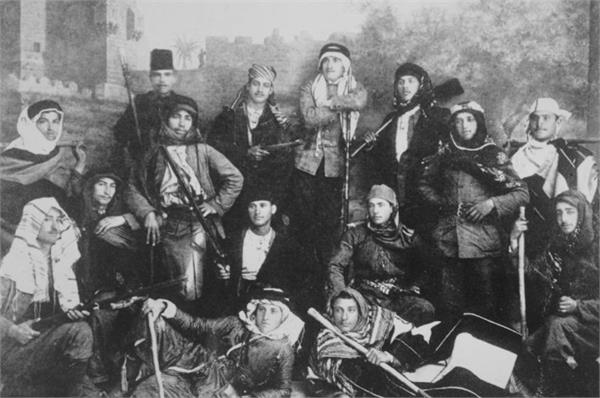
Mikveh Israel students 1920

The village has about 1,800 pupils from the age of 12 to the age of 18; 800 in the General section, 320 in the religious school, 380 in the French-Israeli college and high school. Around 280 students are boarders, and the site also hosts four Montessori and holistic pedagogy kindergartens, and a Montessori elementary school.

In 2007 Mikve Israel and the Alliance Israélite Universelle inaugurated an experimental bilateral Israel-France high school, with half of its pupils studying for the French Baccalauréat and half for Israeli Bagrut. It is the Collège-Lycée franco-israélien Raymond Leven (Hebrew: בה"ס ישראלי-צרפתי ע"ש רמונד לאוון. It serves up to the final year of senior high school.

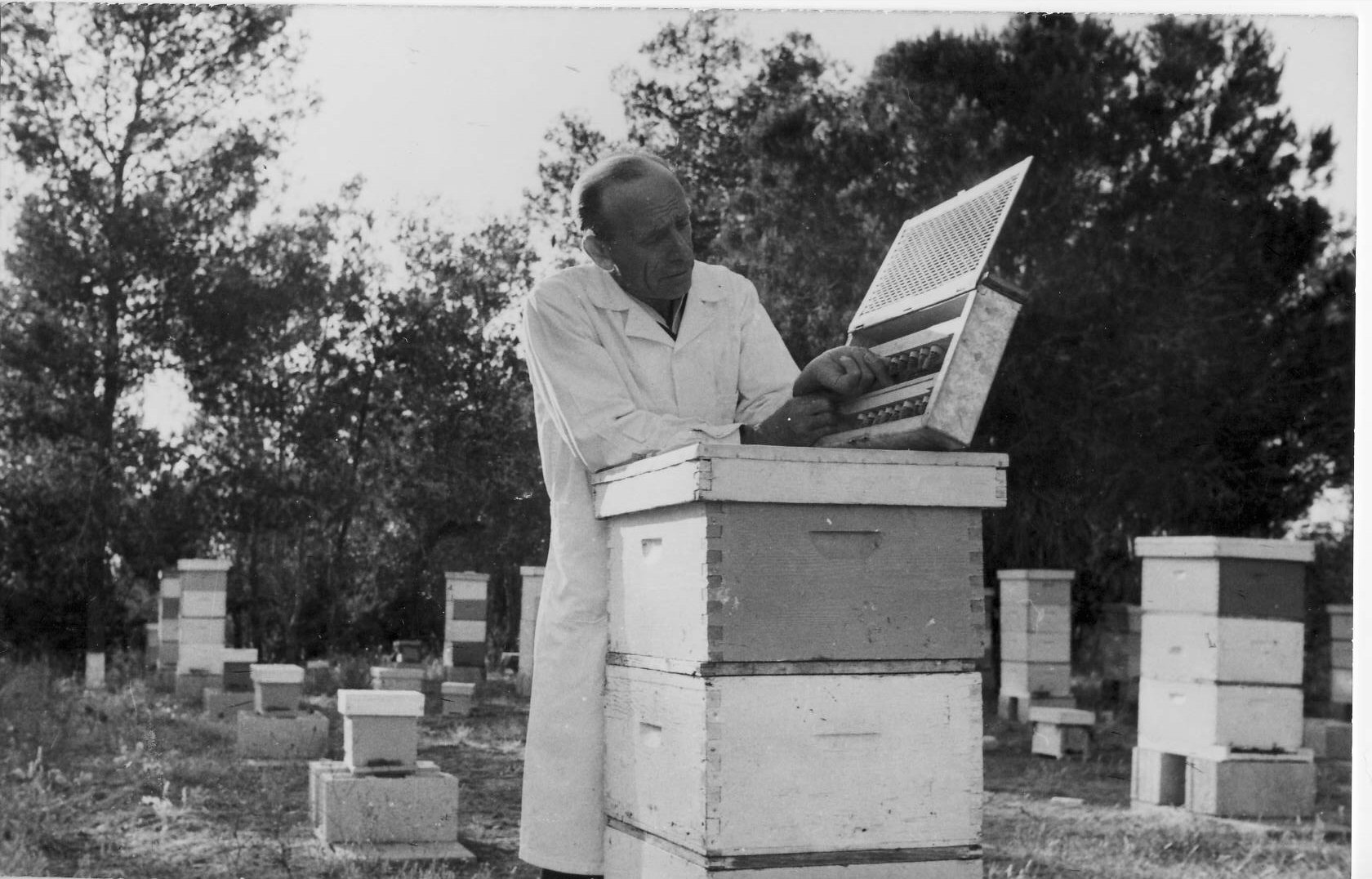
I. Ferman at Mikve-Israel apiary, 1964

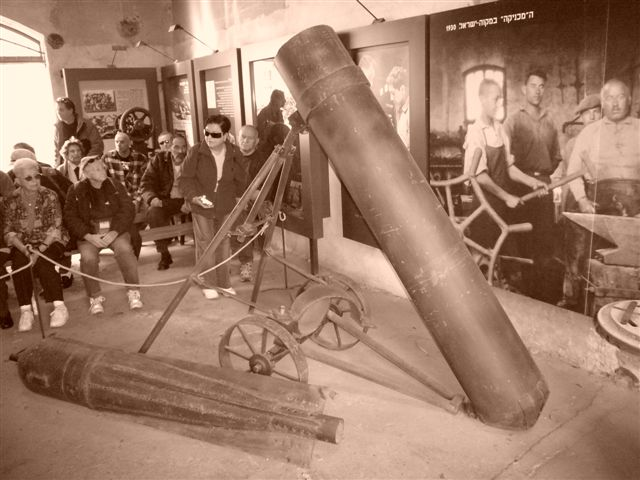
Plowshares to swords - an improvised grenade launcher

== Notable alumni ==
- David Tabak (1927–2012), Olympic runner
- Avraham Yoffe (1913-1983), Soldier, Head of the Nature Preservation Society, politician

== See also ==
- Or Yehuda Agriculture School
- Education in Israel
- Aliyah
- Bilu (movement)
- Joseph Niego
- Education in the Ottoman Empire
  - List of schools in the Ottoman Empire
