= Ribhi Kamal =

Palestinian writer

- ربحی كمال
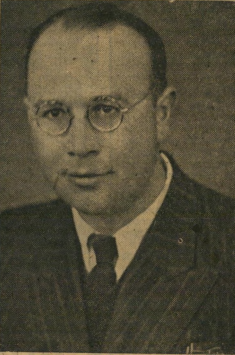
- Kamal c. 1940
- Born: 1913; Jerusalem, Ottoman Empire
- Died: 1979 (aged 65–66)
- Occupations: Writer, teacher, radio broadcaster

Ribhi Tawfik Kamal (Arabic: ربحی كمال; Hebrew: רבחי כמאל; 1913 - 1979) was a Palestinian writer, teacher, scholar of Semitic languages, and radio broadcaster. He became known in Palestine for his mastery of the Hebrew language. Following the Nakba, Kamal lived in exile in Syria, where he used his knowledge of Hebrew to oppose Zionism while working for the Syrian intelligence service.

== Early life ==
Kamal was born in Jerusalem in 1913. He was the son of Tawfik Kamal, an imam at Nebi Akasha Mosque on Straus Street in western Jerusalem. After studying at the Alliance Israélite Universelle in Jerusalem, he continued his studies at Al-Azhar University in Cairo. He was trained as a teacher at the Faculty of Dar Al-Uloom, Cairo University. At Dar Al-Uloom, he studied philology, Aramaic, and Hebrew.

== Career ==
During the 1948 Arab–Israeli War, Kamal became a refugee in Damascus, Syria, where he worked for the Syrian government. He worked for Radio Damascus, where he hosted an anti-Zionist program dedicated to convincing Israeli Jews to reject Zionism and return to their countries of origin.

== See also ==
- Nahda

== Bibliography ==
Kamal, Ribhi. The New Dictionary, Beirut, 1975.
