= Střížov =

- Municipality
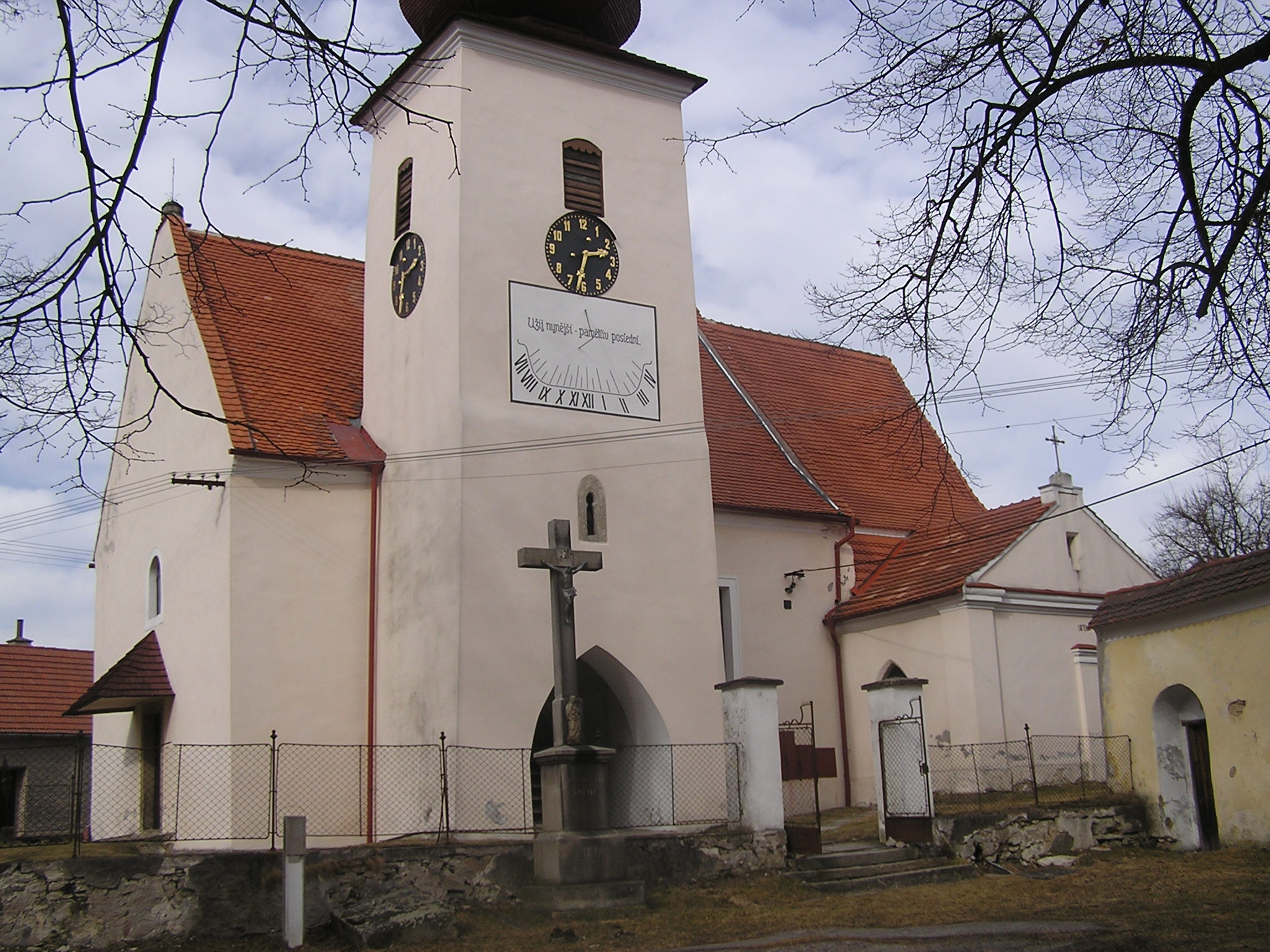
- Church of Saint Martin

- Location in the Czech Republic
- Coordinates: 48°53′26″N 14°31′40″E
- Country: Czech Republic
- Region: South Bohemian
- District: České Budějovice
- First mentioned: 1263

Area
  - Total: 4.66 km^{2} (1.80 sq mi)
- Elevation: 494 m (1,621 ft)

Population (2026-01-01)
  - Total: 216
  - Density: 46.4/km^{2} (120/sq mi)
- Time zone: UTC+1 (CET)
  - Summer (DST): UTC+2 (CEST)
- Postal code: 374 01
- Website: www.strizov.cz

Střížov (German: Driesendorf) is a municipality and village in České Budějovice District in the South Bohemian Region of the Czech Republic. It has about 200 inhabitants.

Střížov lies approximately 11 kilometres (7 mi) south of České Budějovice and 134 km (83 mi) south of Prague.

== Demographics ==
Historical population
Year	Pop.	±%
1869	337	—
1880	387	+14.8%
1890	358	−7.5%
1900	335	−6.4%
1910	371	+10.7%
1921	357	−3.8%
1930	332	−7.0%
1950	221	−33.4%
1961	204	−7.7%
1970	179	−12.3%
1980	154	−14.0%
1991	152	−1.3%
2001	174	+14.5%
2011	197	+13.2%
2021	210	+6.6%
Source: Censuses

== Notable people ==
- Simcha Friedman (1911–1990), Israeli rabbi
