= Joseph Niego =

Jewish activist

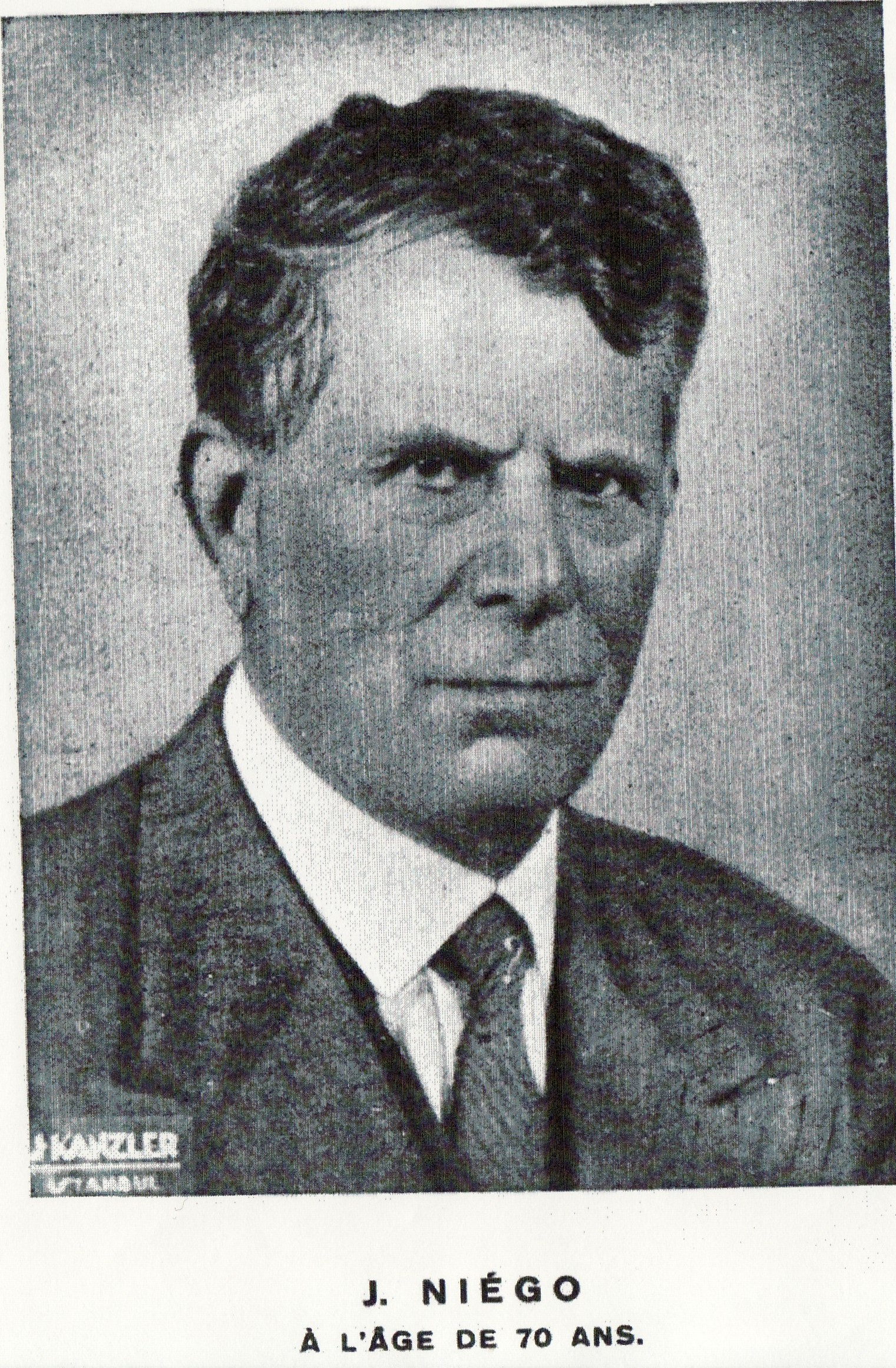

Joseph Niego (1863–1945) also known as Yosef Niego was born in Adrianople (modern-day Edirne, Turkey).

Joseph Niego was one of the leading figures in the creation of the state of Israel. He was instrumental in the political, agricultural, and economical roots of the foundation of the Jewish State.

Niego was sent to France to the Faculty of Agriculture in order to help Mikveh Israel cultivate the land. Thanks to different methodologies, including the Eucalyptus trees he imported to the Holy Land, he dried the swamps that prevented agricultural development. He then served for over 15 years as the General Manager of Mikveh Israel.

In 1891, Baron Moritz de Hirsch founded the Jewish Colonization Association (JCA) in order to help the Russian Jews who were suffering from antisemitism. In 1896 Baron Hirsch appointed Niego as the advisor of JCA in Palestine. Aware of the unemployment and integration problem of the Russian Jewish immigrants, Joseph Niego decided to build economically viable "work-farms" which was a primitive form of a modern-day Kibbutz.

In 1898, Joseph Niego introduced and arranged a meeting between Kaiser Wilhelm II and Theodor Herzl in Palestine, at Mikveh Israel.

In 1911, Joseph Niego founded the B'nai B'rith Grand Lodge District XI that covered all Ottoman lands. The B'nai B'rith lodge in Israel is named after him in order to recognize and honor a life of service to the Jewish causes.

In 1914, Niego founded the first Jewish High School in Turkey and became its first General Manager.

In 1923, Joseph Niego was employed by the American Jewish Joint Distribution Committee (JDC) as head of a fund that offered loans to the small and medium Jewish businesses. The impact of this association helped the Jewish community of Turkey to flourish economically. This system is seen by many people as one of the precursors of microfinance.

In 1945, after more than five decades of service, Joseph Niego died at 82 years old.
