= Charles Netter =

French Zionist (1826–1882)

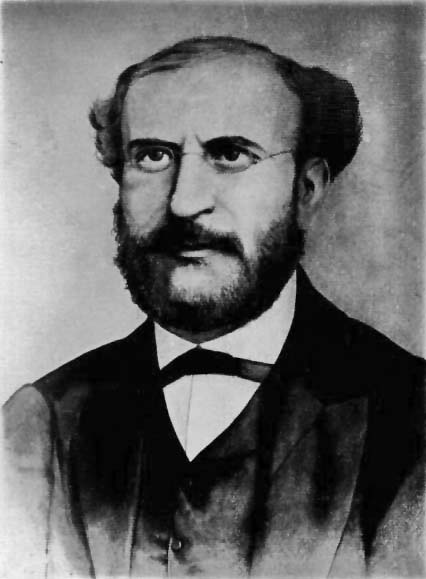
- Charles Netter
- Born: Jacob Carl Netter; September 14, 1826; Strasbourg, France
- Died: October 2, 1882 (aged 56); Jaffa, Ottoman Empire
- Resting place: Mikveh Israel, Israel
- Occupations: Businessman, Zionist
- Known for: Founding member of Alliance Israélite Universelle; Founder of Mikveh Israel

Charles Netter (Hebrew: יעקב 'קרל' נטר; 14 September 1826 – October 2, 1882), was a founding member of the Alliance Israélite Universelle. In 1870, Netter founded Mikveh Israel, the first modern Jewish agricultural settlement in the Land of Israel.

== Biography ==
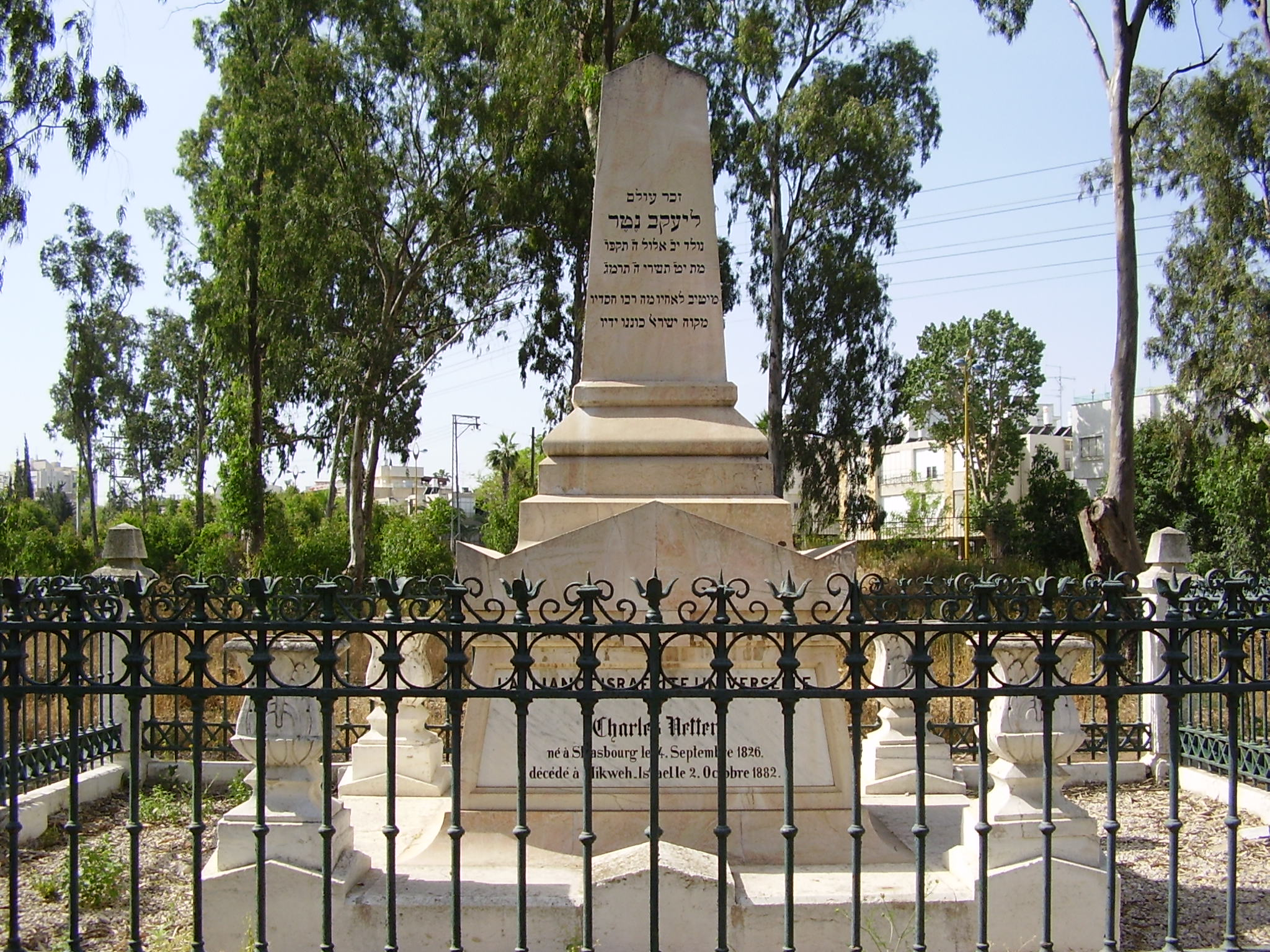
Charles Netter's grave in Mikveh Israel

Charles Netter was born in Strasbourg in 1826 to a Rabbinic family. He studied in Strasbourg and Belfort, and engaged in business in London, Moscow, and Lille. He later moved to Paris. Netter died in Jaffa on October 2, 1882, during a visit to Mikveh Israel. He is buried in Mikveh Israel, his tombstone erected by the AIU. He is considered the pioneer of Jewish agriculture in Israel, having founded the school which educated many members of Bilu and the First Aliyah. Several Israeli cities have named streets after him. Kfar Netter, a moshav near Netanya was founded in 1939, by graduates of Mikveh Israel.

== Alliance Israélite Universelle (AIU) ==
On May 17, 1860, in Paris, in response to antisemitic incidents such as the abduction of Edgardo Mortara and the Damascus affair, he was one of the six founders of the Alliance Israélite Universelle. The founding members defined the organization's goals:
"To gather good-natured people to fight against hate and prejudice.
To create a society of young idealist and militant Jews that feel solidarity with all those who suffer from their condition as Jews or all those who are victims of prejudice, regardless of their religion.
To ensure that culture replaces the ignorance of fanatics, for the good of all.
If you believe that this would be an honor for your religion, a lesson for the people, a progress for humanity, a triumph for truth and for universal reason to witness all the vibrant forces of Judaism come together, small with respect to number but large with respect to love and good will, come to us, we are thus founding the Alliance israélite universelle."
Netter was appointed general secretary of the newly formed organization, and was joined 4 years later by French-Jewish politician Adolphe Crémieux who would serve as the president of the society while holding the position of French Minister of Justice.

== Mikveh Israel ==
In 1868 Netter visited Palestine for the first time. He was sent as a representative of the AIU, to examine the needs of the Jewish community. Upon his return he recommended that a new agricultural settlement be founded, and be used as an agricultural school for Jewish men. Netter obtained an audience with the Ottoman Emperor in Constantinople, and was rewarded with land near Jaffa. The required funds were acquired from the AIU, and Mikveh Israel (Hebrew: מקוה ישראל) was founded in 1870. During the first years Netter struggled with objections of the Jewish Old Yishuv leaders, who concentrated on Torah studies and relied on donations from Jews in the diaspora. The Old Yishuv opposition to Jewish manual labor in the holy land, and clashes with Arab inhabitants of nearby Yazur disrupted development and recruitment of students. The funds proved insufficient as well, and Netter donated his own money, and raised funds from other philanthropists, like Crémieux and the Baron Maurice de Hirsch. Netter managed the school until 1873. He overcame the difficulties of establishing and maintaining the settlement, but accustomed to living conditions in Western-Europe, his health deteriorated. Following his doctor's advice he returned to Europe, but continued to raise funds and support the school, and continued his activities for the AIU. He was involved in protecting the rights and safety of the Jewish community in Morocco, and was in charge of emigration of Russian-Jewish refugees to North-America following the introduction of the May Laws.

== Freemason lodge ==
Charles Netter was one of the twenty signers of a petition sent to a Canadian Freemason leader, who subsequently agreed to the establishment of a lodge "in Jerusalem and surroundings". Only six of those who signed the letter were living in Ottoman Palestine at the time, Netter being the only Jew among the six. The initiator was the prominent American poet and Freemason, Rob Morris, while Rolla Floyd (1832-1911), a fellow American, Jaffa resident and tourism entrepreneur, and German photographer Peter Bergheim (1813-1895) were another two of the six Holy Land-based petitioners. As a result of their initiative, the Royal Solomon Mother Lodge N° 293 was consecrated on May 7, 1873.
