= Melis Alphan =

Turkish journalist and author (born 1978)

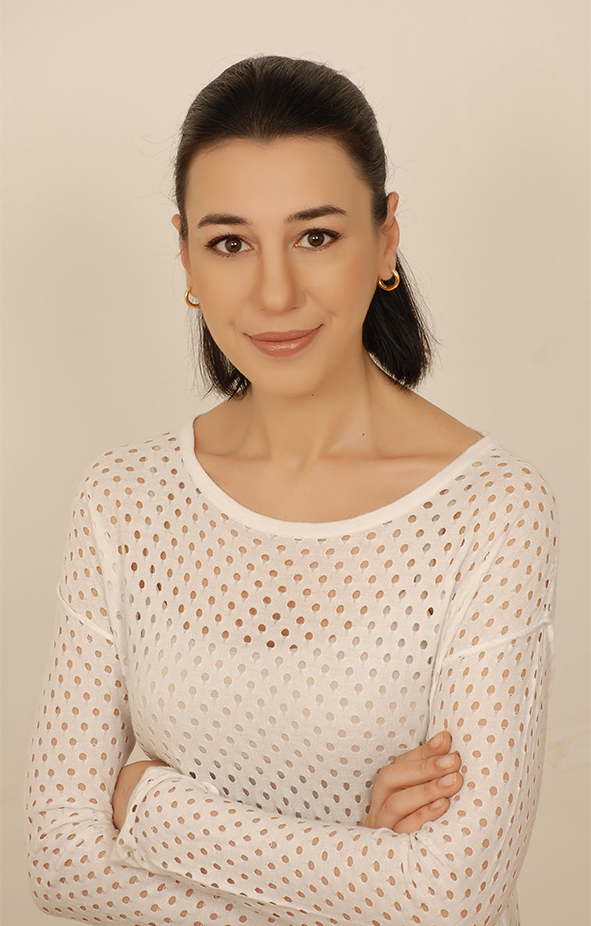
- Melis Alphan
- Born: 1978 (age 46–47); İzmir, Turkey
- Citizenship: Turkish
- Education: American Collegiate Institute London College of Fashion
- Occupation: Journalist
- Years active: 2001-present

Melis Alphan (Melis Çelebi; born 1978), is a Turkish journalist and author. She is known for her women's rights activism and her fashion journalism.

== Education ==
Following her graduation from the American Collegiate Institute in İzmir, she studied Fashion at the London College of Fashion from where she earned a BSc. Following she studied for a while at the Fashion Institute of Technology in New York. In 2001 she returned to Turkey and initiated her journalistic career at the Vizyon magazine. The same year she began working at the newspaper Radikal and by 2003 she received a job at the Milliyet newspaper. In 2009 she started to work at the Hürriyet newspaper, for which she reported for 9 years. She wrote articles on women rights, fashion amongst other issues and with time she became one of the few female journalists to write a column in a Turkish newspaper. In 2018 she was a member of the jury for the Metin Göktepe journalism award. In 2019 she published the book I Will – Inspiring Life Stories.

== Legal prosecution ==
In November 2020 an investigation into a post on her Instagram account about the Kurdish new year celebrations in Diyarbakır in 2015 was initiated. The photograph in question included a flag of the Kurdistan Workers' Party, with which the Turkish government at the time was holding peace negotiations. The prosecution demanded a prison sentence for up to 7 years and 6 months. She was acquitted on May 21, 2021.

== Award ==
- 2013, Traditional Turkey Journalism Awards in the category "Best Interview"
