= Or Yehuda Agriculture School =

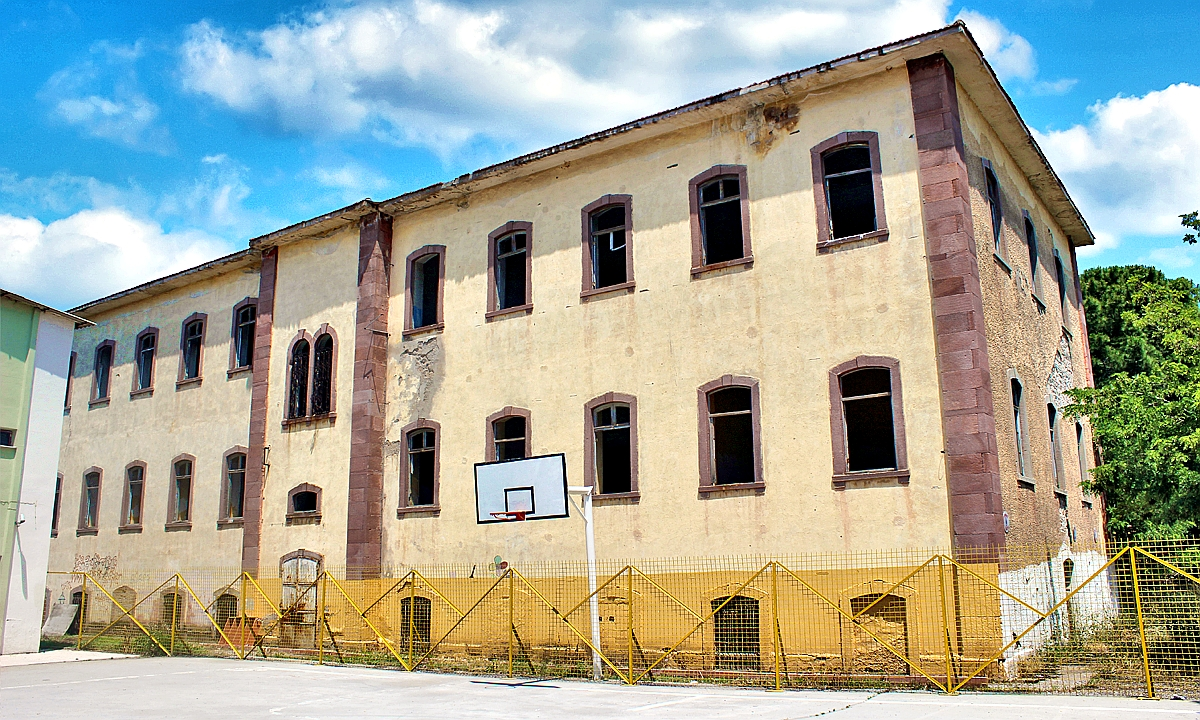
- Interactive map of the Or Yehuda Agriculture School area

General information
- Location: Akhisar, Manisa, Turkey
- Coordinates: 38.88517°N 27.7668°E
- Opened: 1905
- Closed: 1994
- Cost: 84.600 Franc

Height
- Height: 142 m (466 ft)

Technical details
- Material: Stone, brick, cement

Or Yehuda Agriculture School (Turkish: Or Yehuda Tarım Okulu) is a former school established by Jews in 1905 in the Akhisar district of Manisa, Turkey, providing education in the field of agriculture. It was operated by an agricultural colony within the borders of the Kayalıoğlu neighborhood in Akhisar, with the support of the Alliance Israélite Universelle (AIU) and the Jewish Colonization Association (JCA). The language of instruction at the school was French, with the regular education duration set at 3 years and specialization training durations set at 4 and 5 years. The school, operated by the agricultural colony from its establishment in 1905 until 1924, was converted into a primary school by the Ministry of National Education starting from 1945. The building was actively used until 1994 and is currently in a state of disuse.
