= Jewish Colonisation Association =

Organization to facilitate the mass emigration of Jews from Eastern Europe

Jewish Colonization Association
- Abbreviation: JCA
- Formation: 1891
- Founder: Baron Maurice de Hirsch
- Type: Jewish charitable foundation
- Purpose: advocate and public voice, educator and network
- Headquarters: London, England
- Region served: North America (especially Canada, United States), South America (especially Argentina)
- Official language: English, French

The Jewish Colonisation Association (JCA or ICA; (Yiddish/Hebrew: יק"א)) is a Jewish philanthropic organization founded on September 11, 1891, by Baron Maurice de Hirsch. Originally established to facilitate the emigration and agricultural resettlement of Jews from Eastern Europe, particularly in Argentina, it supported settlements in the Americas and later in Ottoman Palestine. Over time, its activities shifted toward charitable and development work. Today known as the Jewish Charitable Association (ICA), it supports development projects in Israel.

== History ==
=== Argentina ===
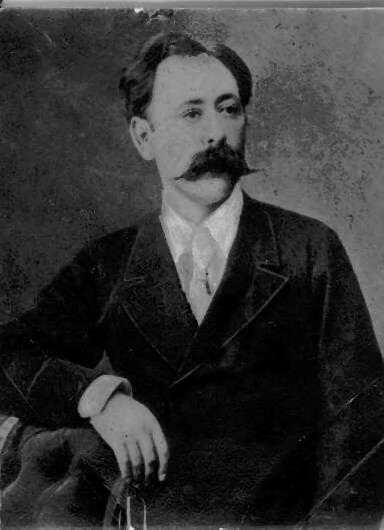
Baron Maurice Hirsch

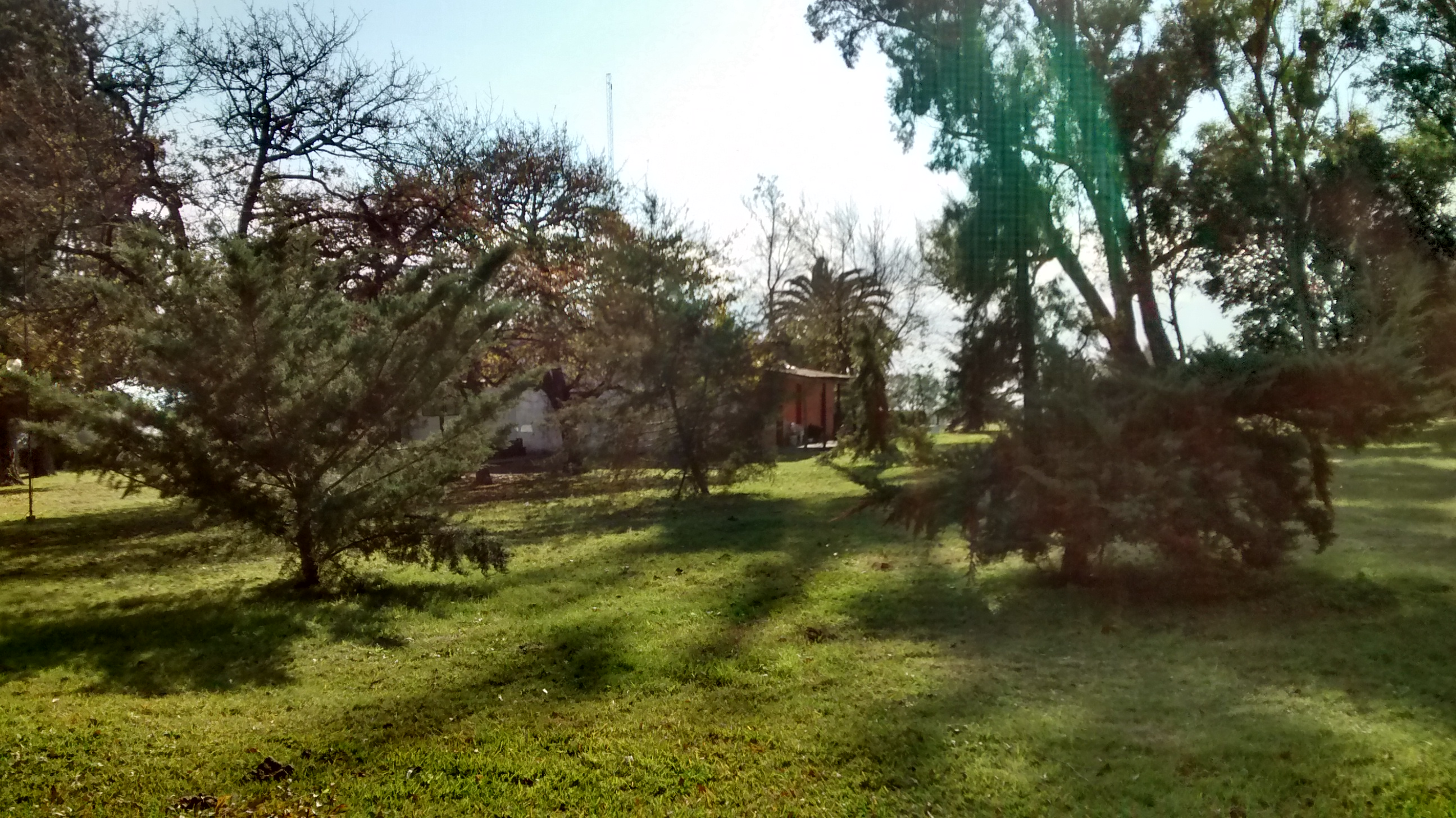
Colonia Avigdor in Entre Ríos, Argentina

Zadoc Kahn presented the German Jewish philanthropist Baron Maurice de Hirsch with the project of setting up a Jewish settlement in Argentina, before JCA was created in 1891. Theodor Herzl considered it expensive and unrealistic. In 1896, when Hirsch died, the association owned a thousand square kilometers of land in the country on which lived a thousand households, the “Jewish gauchos”. It focused on agricultural settlements in Argentina until East European Jews were forbidden to emigrate there. In 1920, 150,000 Jews lived in Argentina and new settlements appeared: Buenos Aires Province (Lapin, Rivera), Entre Ríos (San Gregorio, Villa Domínguez, Carmel, Ingeniero Sajaroff, Villa Clara, and Villaguay), and Santa Fe (Moisés Ville), while about 64% of the Jews in Argentinia lived in Entre Ríos.

=== Palestine and Israel ===
In 1896, after Hirsch's death, the JCA started offering support to Jewish farming communities newly established in Ottoman Palestine. In 1899 Baron Edmond James de Rothschild transferred title to his settlements ("moshavot") in Palestine along with fifteen million francs to the JCA. Starting on January 1, 1900, the JCA restructured the way in which the settlements received financial and managerial support, with the effect of making them more profitable and independent. Between 1900 and 1903 it created 4 new moshavot, Kfar Tavor, Yavniel, Melahamia (Menahamia), and Bait Vegan. In addition, it established an agricultural training farm at Sejera.

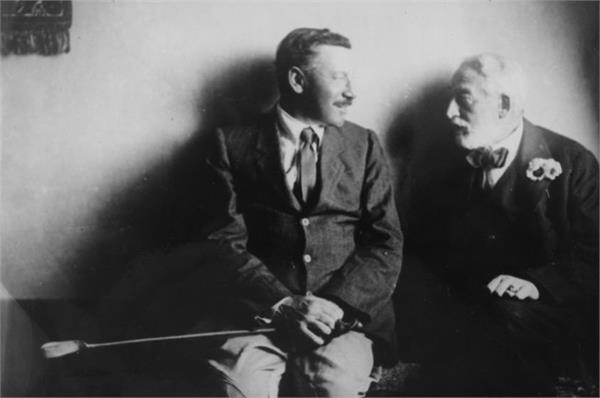
Edmond de Rothschild (right) with the British High Commissioner for Palestine Herbert Samuel, c.1920

The Palestine operation was restructured by Baron de Rothschild in 1924 as the Palestine Jewish Colonization Association (PICA), with his son James Armand de Rothschild appointed as life President. PICA transferred most of its properties to the State of Israel in 1957 and 1958. ICA resumed activities in Palestine in 1933, at first in association with another fund and from 1955 onwards by itself as "ICA in Israel".

In the 21st century, the organisation has focused its efforts on fostering the development of the peripheral regions of the Galilee (north) and the Negev (south), under the name of the Jewish Charitable Association.

=== United States ===
Settlements were founded within the United States in southern New Jersey, Ellington, Connecticut (Congregation Knesseth Israel), and elsewhere.

=== Turkey ===
The JCA also established two agricultural settlements in the first two decades of the 20th century in what now is Turkey. In 1891, JCA bought land near Karataş, Izmir, Turkey, and established an agricultural training centre, or Yehudah, on an area totaling 30 km^{2} by 1902. The centre was closed in 1926 owing to numerous difficulties. A group of Romanian Jews in Anatolia were assisted by JCA in the early 20th century to establish an immigration bureau in Istanbul in 1910. The JCA also bought land in the Asian part of Istanbul and founded Mesillah Hadassah agricultural settlement for several hundred families. In 1928 the settlements were mostly liquidated, with only the immigration bureau remaining to assist migrants in their migration to Palestine.

=== Canada ===
A Canadian Committee of the JCA was established in November 1906 to assist in the settlement of thousands of Jewish refugees fleeing Russia, and to oversee the development of all JCA settlements in the country. Economic factors, notably the Great Depression, led to the dissolution of all western Canadian settlements by the end of World War II. Thereafter concentrating its work in the east, the Canadian chapter of the JCA purchased farms and made loans to farmers in Ontario and Quebec. The JCA Canadian Committee made no loans after 1970 and ceased all legal existence in 1978. The JCA deposited the majority of its papers at the National Archives of the Canadian Jewish Congress in 1978, and the remainder (the "S" collection) there in 1989.

== Directors-General ==
- Sigismond Sonnenfeld (1891–1911)
- Louis Oungre (1911–1949)
- Victor Girmounsky and Georges Aronstein (1949–1977)
- Akiva Ettinger (Director General of the Jewish Colonization Association in Southern Russia, Brazil, and Argentina)

== See also ==
- Kolonja Izaaka, Belarus
- Moisés Ville, Argentina
- Jewish Territorial Organization
- Joseph Niego
- Organization for Jewish Colonization in Russia
- Or Yehuda Agriculture School
- Proposals for a Jewish state
- Uganda Scheme
