= Ori Yogev =

Israeli businessman (born 1960)

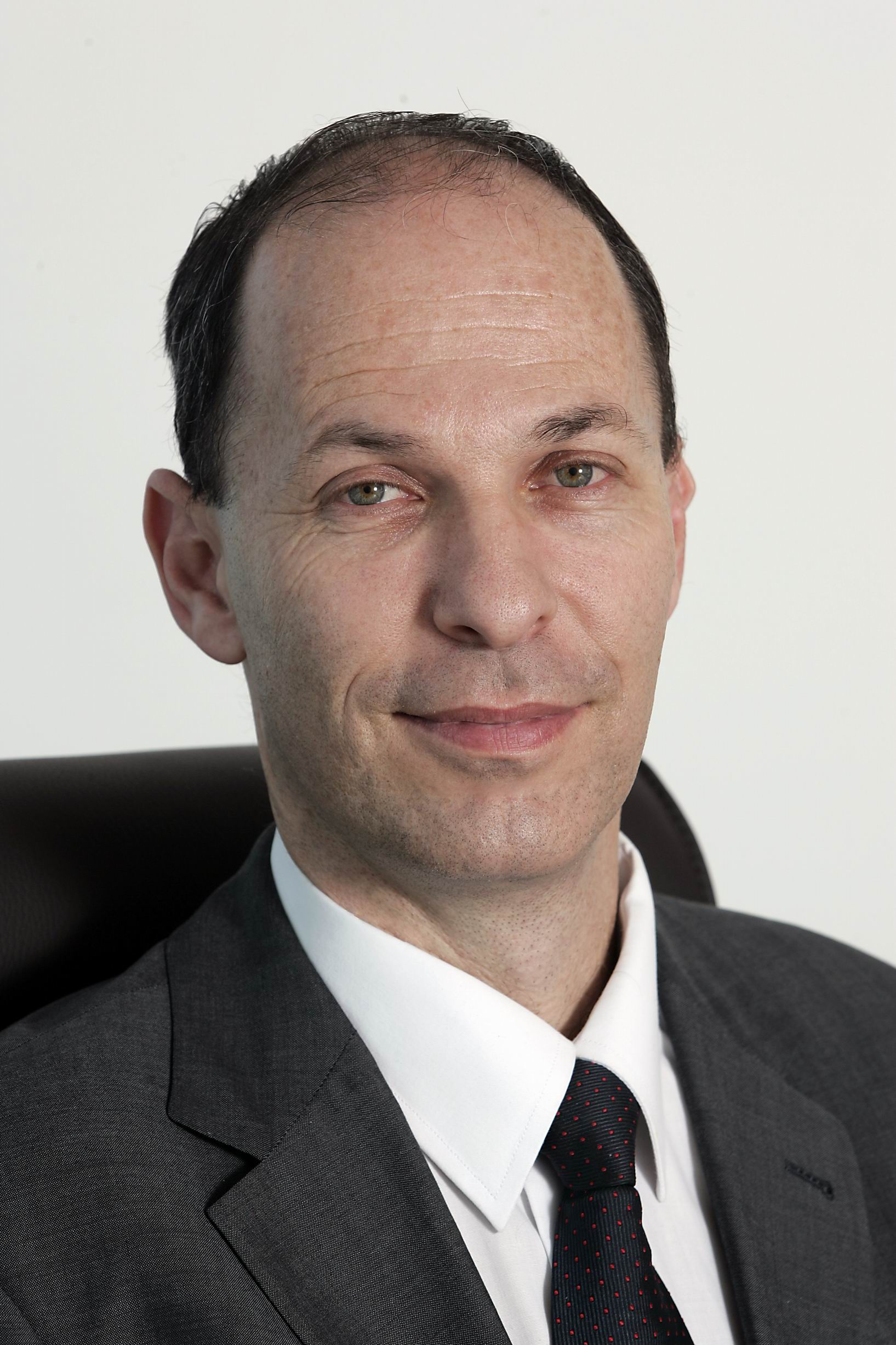
Ori Yogev

Ori Yogev (Hebrew: אורי יוגב; born November 3, 1960) is an Israeli businessman who served as the head of the Budget Division in the Ministry of Finance between 2002 and 2004. Between 2009 and 2010, he was the chair of the Israel National Economic Council Advisory Committee. From 2013 to 2017 Yogev served as director of the Government Companies Authority. Yogev is one of the founders and the chair of the Aluma Infrastructure Investment Fund.

== Biography ==
Yogev was born in Safed to parents who worked in the public sector. His father worked in the Department of Agriculture and his mother worked for the Tel Aviv Municipality. His childhood was spent in Haifa and Tel Aviv, where he attended the Alliance High School. He served as a captain in the Intelligence Corps of the Israeli Defence Forces.

Yogev has a Bachelor of Arts in economics from Tel Aviv University and a Master of Arts cum laude in Economics from The Hebrew University of Jerusalem. He began his career in the Ministry of Finance at age 26 working as a referent in the area of subsidies and government imports. Within a year, he was appointed senior adviser to the director of the Ministry of Finance, a position he held until leaving in 1990.

Between 1990 and 1993 Yogev managed the Jerusalem district as vice-president of "Ha Magen" insurance company. Between 1993 and 2001 he was CEO of the Ha'saneh insurance company as it downsized. Between 1994 and 1997 he served as CEO of Omni Food Brands, a Domino's Pizza franchise, and Häagen-Dazs. Between 1997 and 2001 he was CEO of Bezeq International.

== Ministry of Finance ==
In 2002 Yogev was appointed by Finance Minister Silvan Shalom as head of the ministry's Budget Division. He served in this position until April 2004. His appointment coincided with a recession in Israel's economy due to the high-tech crash and the Second Intifada. The treasury worked to pass legislation for the Emergency Economic Plan, and pursued a liberal economic policy under Benjamin Netanyahu, who replaced Shalom in 2003. This included extensive cuts in government spending and comprehensive reforms, the drafting and implementation of which were led by Yogev.

During his tenure, automatic increases in governmental budgets by means of indices such as linkage and natural population growth were replaced by a law that capped annual budget growth at 1%. Welfare benefits were linked to the Consumer Price Index instead of the average salary, child benefits were reduced, and the budgetary pension of civil servants was replaced by a cumulative pension. The retirement age was raised, and the number of public sector workers was reduced. The pension funds of the Histadrut trade union were also nationalized. According to Yogev, the strategy implemented in this period was intended to avoid targeting the wealthy, so they would not leave the country, while the recession was used to justify the reduction of organized labor in the economy.

After leaving this post, Yogev continued to work as a consultant to the treasury for several months, which led to the ports reform, which Yogev had championed during his tenure.

== Public career ==
In 2009, Yogev was appointed as chair of Prime Minister Benjamin Netanyahu's National Economic Council Advisory Committee, and led the financial program and the package deal with Histadrut. That year, The Marker magazine ranked Yogev as the 9th most influential person in the Israeli economy, based on his role as a consultant to Netanyahu.

=== Chair of Israel Railways ===
In 2010, Yogev was one of the officials behind the "Israel Ways" program for significant development of Israel Railways' infrastructure. The plan was approved by the Netanyahu government, and Yogev was appointed as chair of its Advisory Committee and of the Railway Board until mid-2013.

During his tenure as chair, there were extensive changes to the organization's personnel structure, and the chair of the committee, Gila Edrei, was dismissed.

=== General manager of the Government Companies Authority ===
Yogev served from September 2013 to September 2017 as the general manager of the Government Companies Authority. In this capacity, he initiated reforms in government companies, based on the OECD's concept, which turned a NIS 600 million loss in 2013 into an aggregate profit of NIS 2.6 billion in 2016.

In November 2013, the Directors' team was launched, aimed at ending political involvement in government companies. Since its establishment, the number of women represented on boards of directors has risen to 50%, and 10% of directors are from minority groups. A report prepared by the Government Companies Authority indicated that since the establishment of the directors' team, the percentage of family members in government companies has fallen by 80%.

=== Later work ===
Yogev is a co-founder and the chair of the board of the Aluma Infrastructure Investment Fund, established in 2020. He is also the chairman of Datumate Ltd., Esco Israel – Electricity & Energy Ltd., Future Mobility II, Tibar Ltd., Green Anchors Ltd., T.M. Communication Towers Ltd., and Esco Aluma Ltd.. Yogev is the Director of Tamares Telecom Ltd., Profero Ltd., O. Yogev Consultants Ltd., and Baladi Belev-Yam Ltd.

== Political views ==
Yogev supports extensive privatization of the public sector, as well as the transfer of government controlled activities and assets to the private sector. He argues that the state should buy services (including social services and education) from private companies rather than provide them. Yogev is strongly opposed to the existence of monopolies, including government monopolies, and has called for the dismantling of the Israel Lands Administration and the transfer of land in its possession to private ownership, as well as breaking of the monopoly of the largest commercial banks. However, he has said that even a privately owned monopoly is preferable to a government-controlled entity.
