= Jewish community of Tétouan =

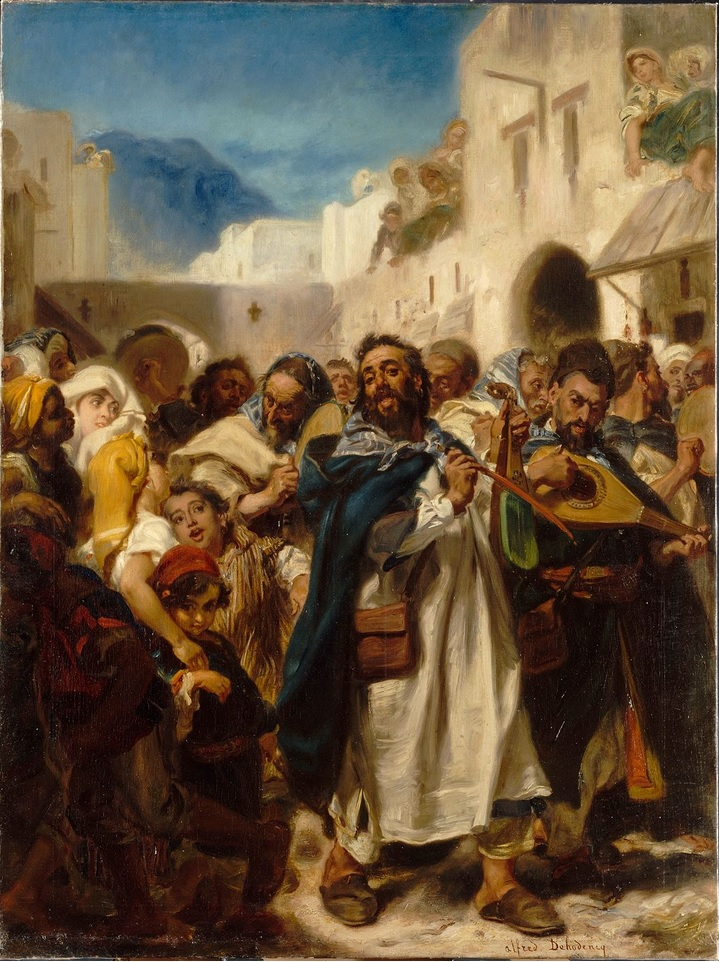
Fête juive à Tétouan (1865) by Alfred Dehodencq

The Jews of Tetuan are members of a community founded by Jews who had been expelled from Spain and Portugal to Morocco, along with Muslims who had also been expelled from the Iberian Peninsula. They were distinguished by the characteristics of the Spanish-Andalusian culture that they brought with them: language, manners, appearance, dress, education and occupation. The community was called "Jerusalem de Maroco" (Jerusalem of Morocco), or "Pequeña Jerusalem" (Little Jerusalem). It was served by renowned rabbis and dayanim, and the synagogues had a large collection of ancient holy books.

The Jews of Tetuan, like the rest of the Jews of northern Morocco, used to speak a specifically Tetuani dialect of Ladino called Haketia, which combines words from Spanish, Hebrew, and Arabic.

== History ==
Tetuan (Arabic: تطوان; Standard Moroccan Tamazight: ⵜⵉⵟⵟⴰⵡⵉⵏ, romanized: Tīṭṭāwīn 'the springs') is situated at the mouth of the Martil River and the flanks of Jabal Darsa of the Rif, near the ancient Berbero-Roman city of Tamuda in Northern Morocco. Little is known about the garrison town or its Jewish community before the expulsion of Jews from Spain in 1492. It was left abandoned after a Portuguese raid in 1437.

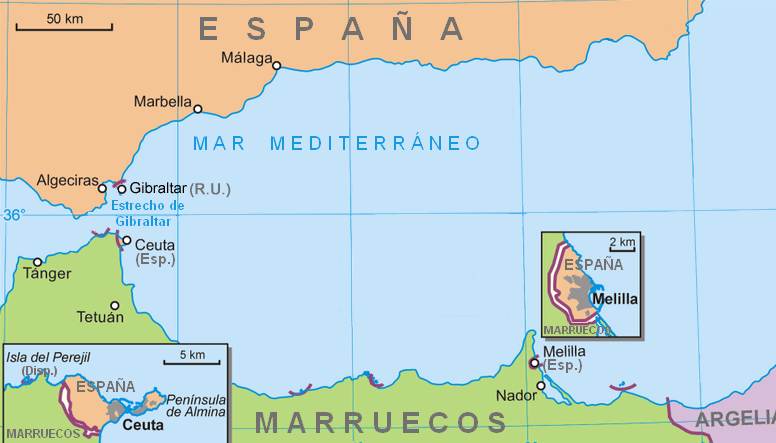
Map of Tetuan in relation to other large Western Mediterranean cities, which also had important Sephardic communities: Gibraltar, Tangier, Ceuta, and Melilla

Tetuan was re-established in the late 15th century by Jewish and Muslim refugees from the Iberian Peninsula. The founder of Chefchaouen around the time of the Fall of Granada, Sharīf ʿAlī b. Rāshid al-ʿAlamī, welcomed Andalusi refugees. The Gharnati refugee Abū ʾl-Ḥasan ʿAlī al-Manẓarī re-established Tetuan as many Sephardic Jews were arriving following the expulsion of Jews from Spain. Haketia, or Spanish as spoken by Sephardic Jews in North Africa, remained the mother tongue of the Tetuani Jewish community into the 20th century, according to Jessica Marglin.

The Jewish community in Tetuan was formally established in 1530 with Rabbi Ḥayyim ben Abraham Bibas, who came from a Sephardic family that had originally settled in Fes. He founded a yeshiva and established the taqqanot of the Spanish Jews in Fes, which remained a major source of customary law in the city. His synagogue was destroyed in 1610, but by 1727 the city had seven synagogues. One of his descendants is Rabbi Yehuda Bibas, considered one of the forerunners of Zionism. Among the founders of Jewish customs in the city was Rabbi Yaakov Halevi, the city's rabbi in the 17th century. Among the prominent Jews in the city during the 17th century was the poet and halachic arbiter Yitzhak Aruvash, who later moved to Italy. Rabbi Hasdai Almoshenino (1640–1727) served as a judge in the city. He later moved his seat to Gibraltar. He is known for his books "Mishmeret Hakodesh" on Rashi's commentary on the Torah and "Chesed El".

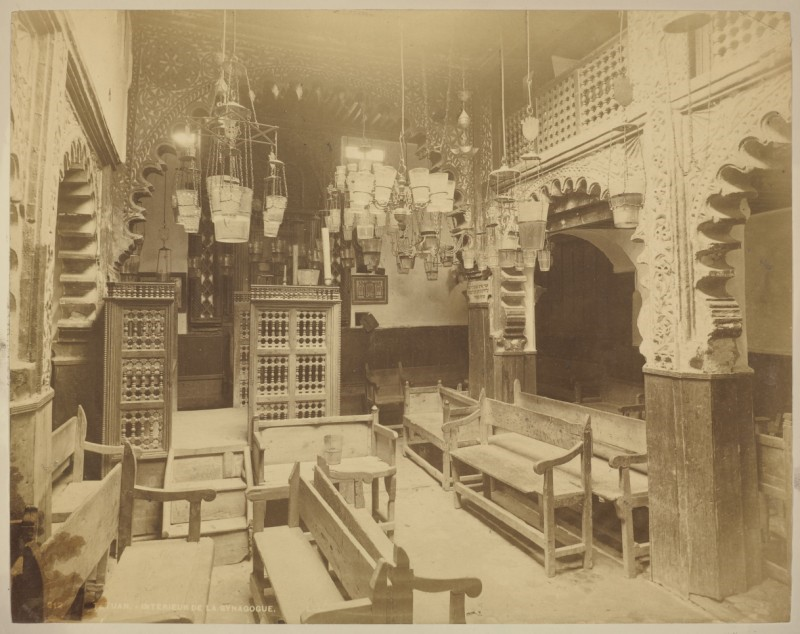
A synagogue in Tétouan in the late 19th century.

The Sephardic Jewish refugees from Iberia were referred to within the wider Moroccan Jewish community as Rūmiyīn (Moroccan Arabic: روميين, lit. 'Romans, Europeans, foreigners') or Megorashim (Hebrew: מגורשים "expelled"), in contrast with the Bildiyīn (Moroccan Arabic: بلديين, lit. 'of the country, natives') or Toshavim (Hebrew: תושבים, "residents"). The descendants of the Megorashim in Tetuan (as in Tangier and other cities) maintained their own unique identity. According to Moisés Orfali, these Spanish-speaking Tetuani Jews would refer to all other Moroccan Jews—including Toshavim as well as Megorashim that became Arabized and lost the ability to speak Ladino—as forasteros 'outsiders'.

The Jewish community grew in the 16th century as the city became an international commercial center. Jewish merchants established trade relations with Algiers, Tunis, Livorno, Lisbon, Gibraltar, and Amsterdam. Tetuan also became a center of piracy, an activity in which Jews participated mostly as intermediaries in the sale of Christian captives.

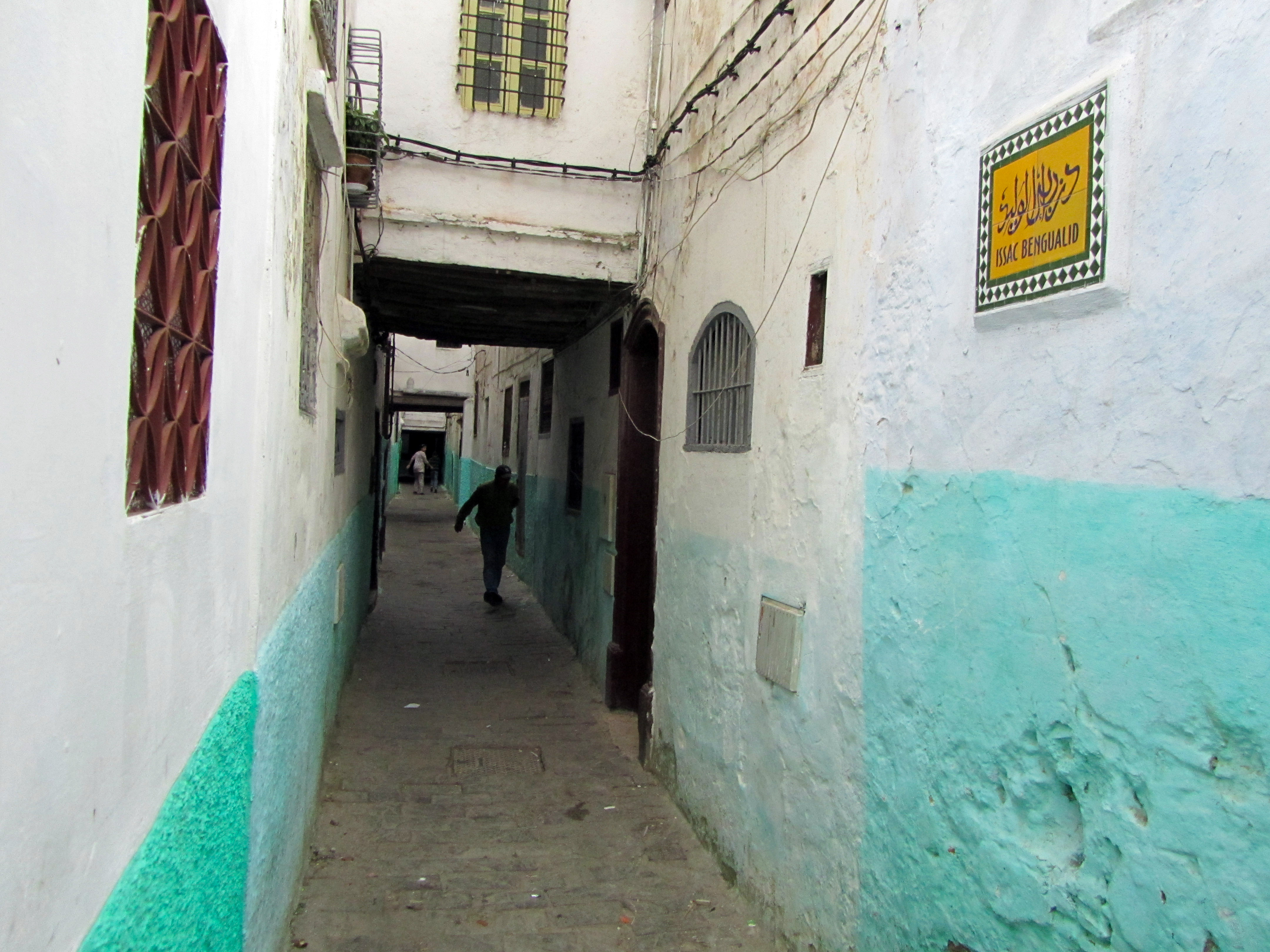
A street in the mellah named for Isaac Ben Walid

In the 19th century, the city was home to the Dayan Rabbi Yitzhak ben Walid (1789–1870), author of the book "And Yitzhak Said" (ויאמר יצחק) which includes information about the social, economic, and religious life of the city's residents. He supported the Alliance Israélite Universelle. In 1862, this organization established a Jewish school for boys in the city, the first Alliance school in Morocco, and in 1868 it also founded a school for girls. The schools provided modern education in Spanish and French, and also included Jewish subjects and Hebrew studies.

=== Attitudes of the authorities ===
Following Sultan Sidi Mohammed ben Abdallah's death in 1789, Mulay Yazid ascended to the throne, which resulted in a horrific slaughter of Moroccan Jews who had refused to back him in his struggle with his brother for the crown. When he entered the city of Tétouan, the city's wealthy Jews were punished by being tied to horses and dragged through the streets, and his soldiers broke into the Jewish quarter and disrupted the community. Observers remarked that Yazid authorized his black troops to plunder Tétouan's Jewish quarter.

At the beginning of the 19th century, around 1807, Sultan Sulayman forced Jews to move to mellahs in the towns of the coastal region, in Rabat, Salé, Essaouira, and Tétouan. In Tétouan, the Spanish word judería was later used as the name of the district.

In 1860, during the Hispano-Moroccan War, and before the city fell after the Moroccan defeat in the Battle of Tétouan, disorganized Moroccan troops stormed the city's Jewish quarter, killing about 400 of them. Most of the others fled for their lives.

Following the 1859–1860 Hispano-Moroccan War, a significant exodus of Jewish residents from Tétouan occurred due to economic collapse, insecurity, and fear of retaliation after the Spanish withdrawal in 1862. Thousands migrated to Oran (French Algeria), Ceuta, Melilla, and Gibraltar to join existing Sephardic networks, or to America, mainly to Brazil (see Amazonian Jews) and to the United States.

=== Spread of Zionism ===
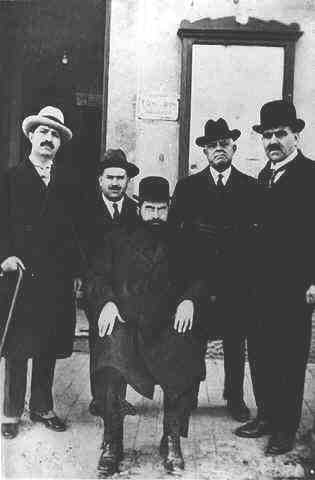
Seated: Rabbi Judah Leon Jalfón, founder of Shivat Zion society in Tétouan. Standing, left to right: Ariel Bension, the Jewish National Fund emissary to Spanish Morocco, Abraham Bengualid of the local community and Kansino of Manchester, 1921

Zionism in Morocco dates back to the period just before colonization, around 1900–1912 due to the influence of European Zionist activists, and it was mostly limited to coastal cities, which had more direct contact with Europe as well as populations of Jews who received a European education, especially from the Alliance Israélite Universelle. Among these coastal cities was Tetuan, where the Russian physician Dr. Ya'akov Barliawsky settled and established the Shivat-Zion (שיבת ציון 'Return to Zion') Association (Note: Also Shivat Ṣiyyon Society.) around 1900. The AIU facilitated the arrival of Dr. Jacques Berliowsky (Yaʿaqov Barliawsky) in 1891. Judah Leon Jalfón, a rabbi in Tetuan, wrote to Theodor Herzl of the establishment of the Shivat-Zion society as early as 1900. The society did not last long, but it started a Hebrew library with modern Hebrew literature.

Zionist activity in Morocco was stifled after the formal establishment of French and Spanish colonial rule in Morocco in 1912, with the activity of local Zionist associations mostly limited to the dissemination of Zionist literature and the popularization of the shekel. In 1919, the Tetuani Rabbi Judah Leon Jalfón, a pillar of Zionism in the Spanish zone, published an article in support of Zionism in El Eco de Tetuán, a Spanish newspaper, in which he fuses political and religious Zionism, described Zion (Palestine) as the birthplace of the Jewish nation, and described Zionism as "the idea of a people living in their free homeland."

In the early and mid-1920s, envoys from Zionist organizations Keren Hayesod and the Jewish National Fund, such as Avraham Elmalih, Nathan Halpern, and Ariel Bension, encountered difficulties in soliciting donations and support from Northern Moroccan Jews in cities such as Tetuan and Tangier. According to Ariel Bension, the main reasons for resistance to Zionism among Northern Moroccan Jews were that they saw it as an irreligious movement and not concerned with the interests of Sephardim. In 1921, Zionists in Spanish Morocco elected to send Ariel Bension as their delegate to the Zionist Congress, marking the first time Moroccan Jews were represented at any Zionist Congress. The influential Zionist activist Samuel-Daniel Levy was born to a Sephardic family in Tetuan in 1874.

=== Spanish rule ===
By a treaty between France and Spain on 27 November 1912, Tetuan and its Jewish community came under Spanish rule with the establishment of the Spanish protectorate in Morocco, which had Tetuan as its capital. Spanish Africanists in the Spanish military and Ministry of Foreign Affairs espoused political philosephardism (filosefardismo), which sought to sponsor the Sephardic community in Morocco, pursue its Hispanicization, and promote within it a sense of loyalty to Spain. The policy of philosephardism was welcomed by part of the Sephardic elite, especially those who had been Spanish protégés, had business ties with Spain, or held Spanish citizenship. Unlike the territory to the south under French colonial rule, there were no antisemitic laws passed in the territory under Spanish colonial rule. (Note: Herbert Richter, German consul general in Tetouan, unsuccessfully sought to pressure Spanish authorities into passing anti-Jewish measures and also sought to incite hostility between Muslims and Jews.) In colonial documents, Jews were referred to as 'Hebrews' or 'Israelites' and were considered neither "indigenous" nor "locals"; they were instead viewed by colonial authorities as "mediators" between the Spanish colonial authorities and the local population.

In 1913, in compliance with the dahir of Khalifa Muley el Mehdi Ben Ismail, the population census and housing statistics were carried out, resulting in a population of 18,533 inhabitants, of whom 11,623 practiced Islam, 4250 Judaism and 3006 Roman Catholicism.

Quarter	Population	Muslims	Jews	Catholics	Protestants	Others
El Bled	4 435	4 154	0	278	3	0
El Rabat Es-Sefli	3 878	3 032	40	802	1	3
El Trancats	2 201	1 775	18	407	1	0
El Aiun	2 707	2 252	0	455	0	0
El Mellah	4 799	2	4186	605	3	3
Outside the walls	513	48	6	459	0	0
Total	18 533	11 623	4 250	3 006	8	6

In 1940, the Jewish population reached its historic peak at 8,058 individuals, making Tétouan the largest Jewish community within the Spanish Protectorate in Morocco. However, this demographic peak was followed by a sharp and steady decline in the mid-20th century due to mass emigration. Following the establishment of the State of Israel in 1948 and the independence of Morocco, large waves of Tétouani Jews emigrated to Israel, the Tangier International Zone, South America, and Europe. By 1951, the community had nearly halved to 4,122 residents, a figure that plummeted further to 3,103 by 1960, leaving only a handful of Jewish residents in the city today.

== Culture ==
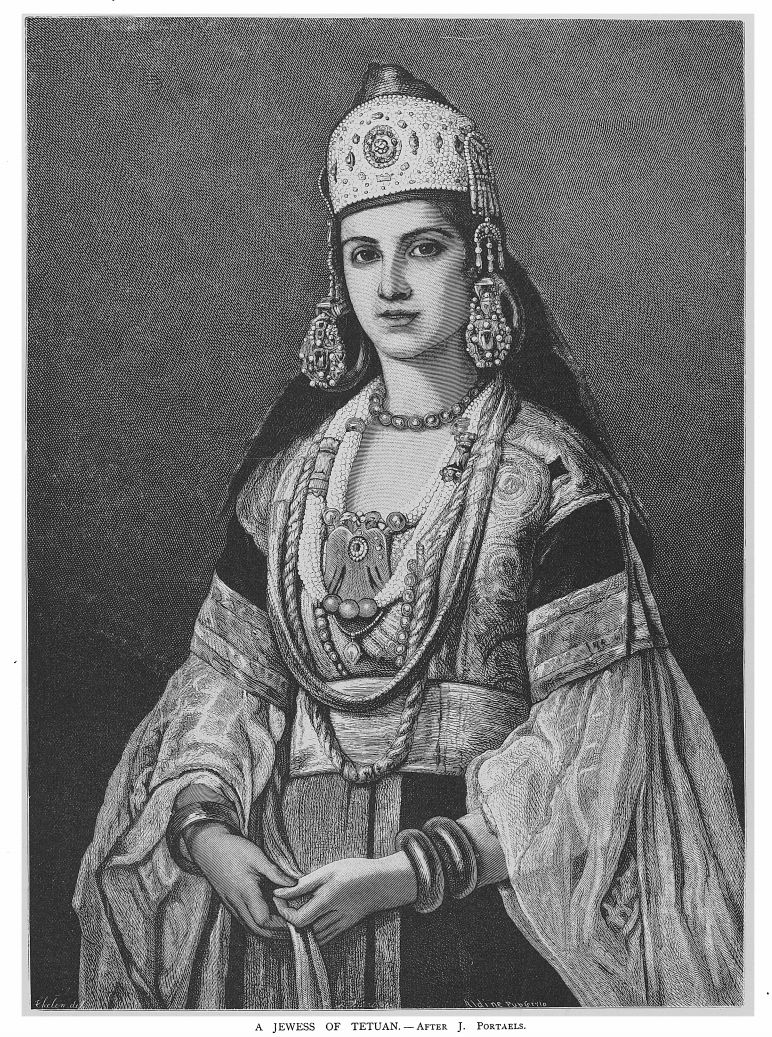
Jewess of Tetuan (1879) by Jean-François Portaels

=== Language ===
Into the 20th century, the mother tongue of the Jewish community of Tetuan was a distinct Tetuani dialect of Haketia or Ladino, Ibero-Romance as spoken by Sephardic Jews. In discussion of the Talmud, Tetuani scholars would use Haketia in Hebrew script.

Nina Pinto-Abecasis has studied the use of humor in nickname culture among Tetuani Jews.

=== Music ===
Musical genres in the musical traditions of Jewish communities in northern Morocco included romances, ballads, and coplas, or "praliturgical poems in rhyming couplets and triplets," among other genres.

=== Education ===
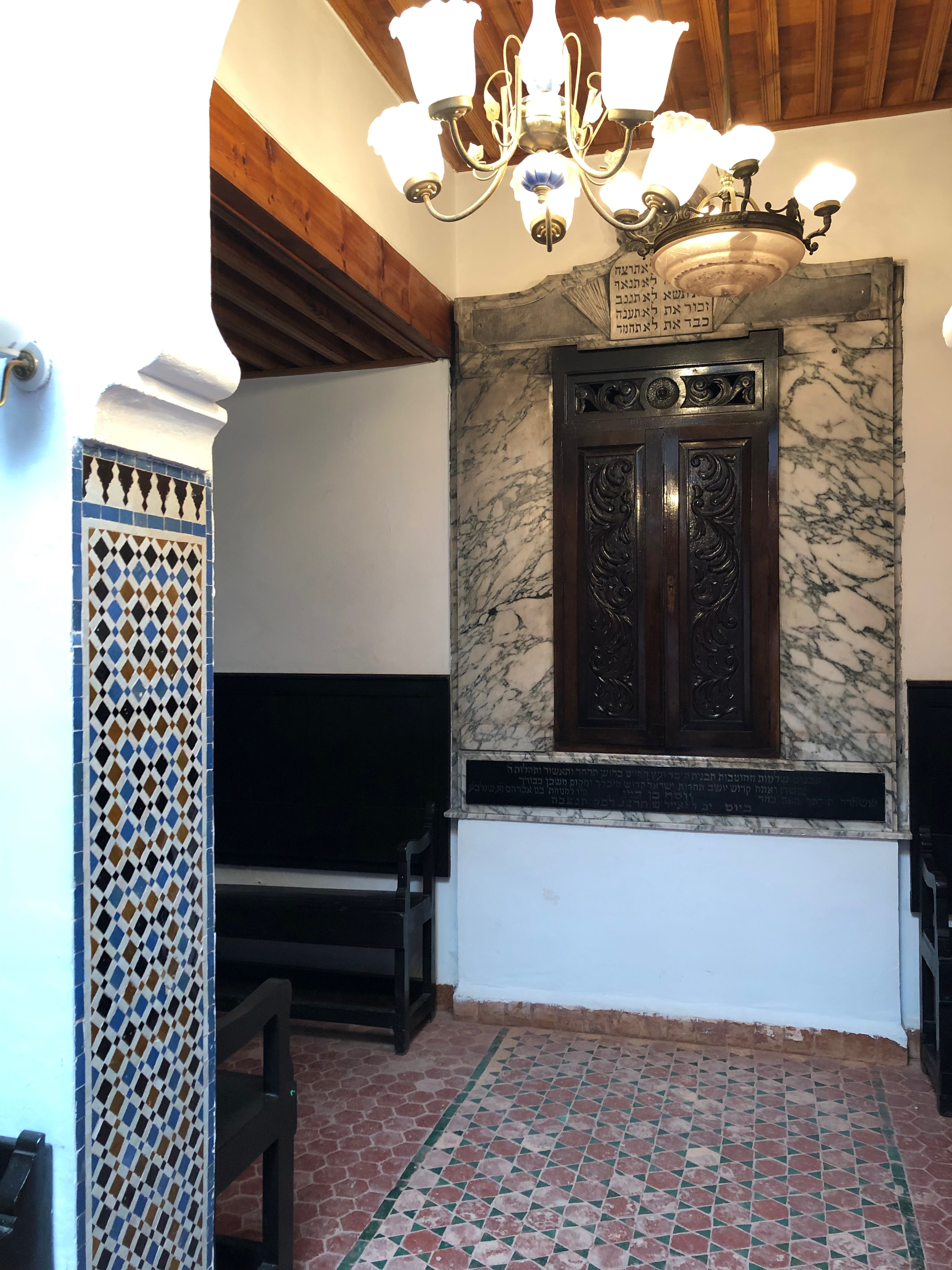
Isaac Ben Walid Synagogue, named after Isaac Ben Walid, rabbi of Tétouan, author, and founder of the first school of the AIU in 1862.

Rabbinical scholars in Tetuan did not study only in local synagogues; many Tetuani scholars went to study in Fes, especially in the 16th and 17th centuries.

In those centuries, unlike nearby cities under European rule, such as Tangier or Ceuta, there was no Jewish religious education and no evidence of use of Jewish languages—Hebrew and Haketia or Ladino—Tetuan had active Jewish religious schools and Hebrew and Haketia were spoken as a part of daily life.

=== Literature ===
In the late 1940s, Rabbi Dr. Salomon Ben Shabbat established the Instituto Maimonides (Maimonides Institute) in the city, which researched the poetry and literature of Sephardic Jewry.

== Characteristics ==
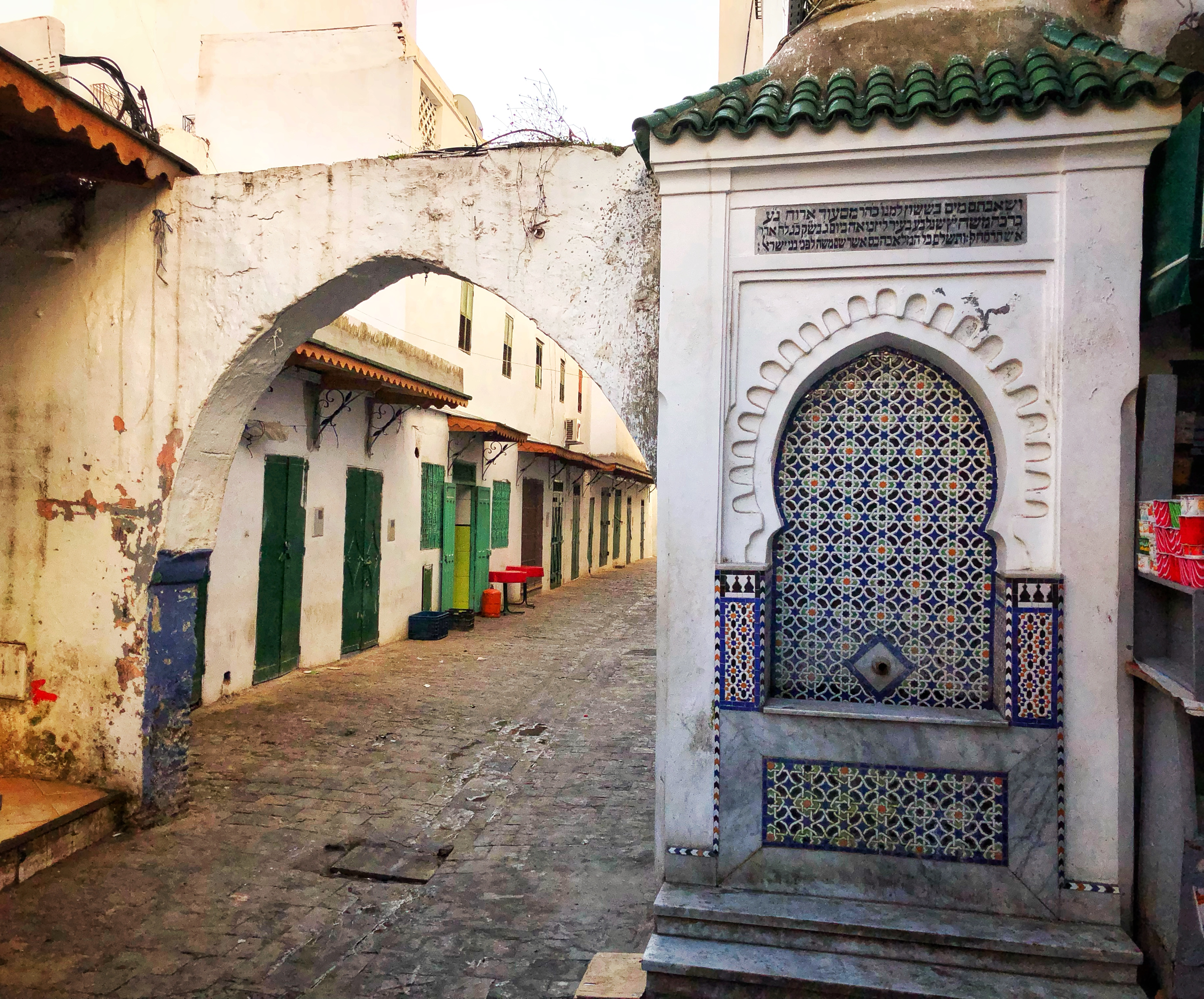
Mellah of Tétouan

About 200 years ago, the new Mellah was built and the Jews of the old Mellah, who had been expelled from it generations earlier, were moved to it. The new Mellah was built of straight, parallel streets and long, narrow alleys, similar to most of the Mellahs of Morocco. It excelled in order and cleanliness. The synagogues were beautiful and well-kept.[8] In 1900, the "Shivat Zion" Association was founded in the city, the first Zionist association in Morocco (together with the "Shivat Zion Association", which was founded at the same time in Mogador). At the initiative of the association's president, Rabbi Yehuda Leon Kalfon, a Hebrew library was established in the city with modern Hebrew literature.

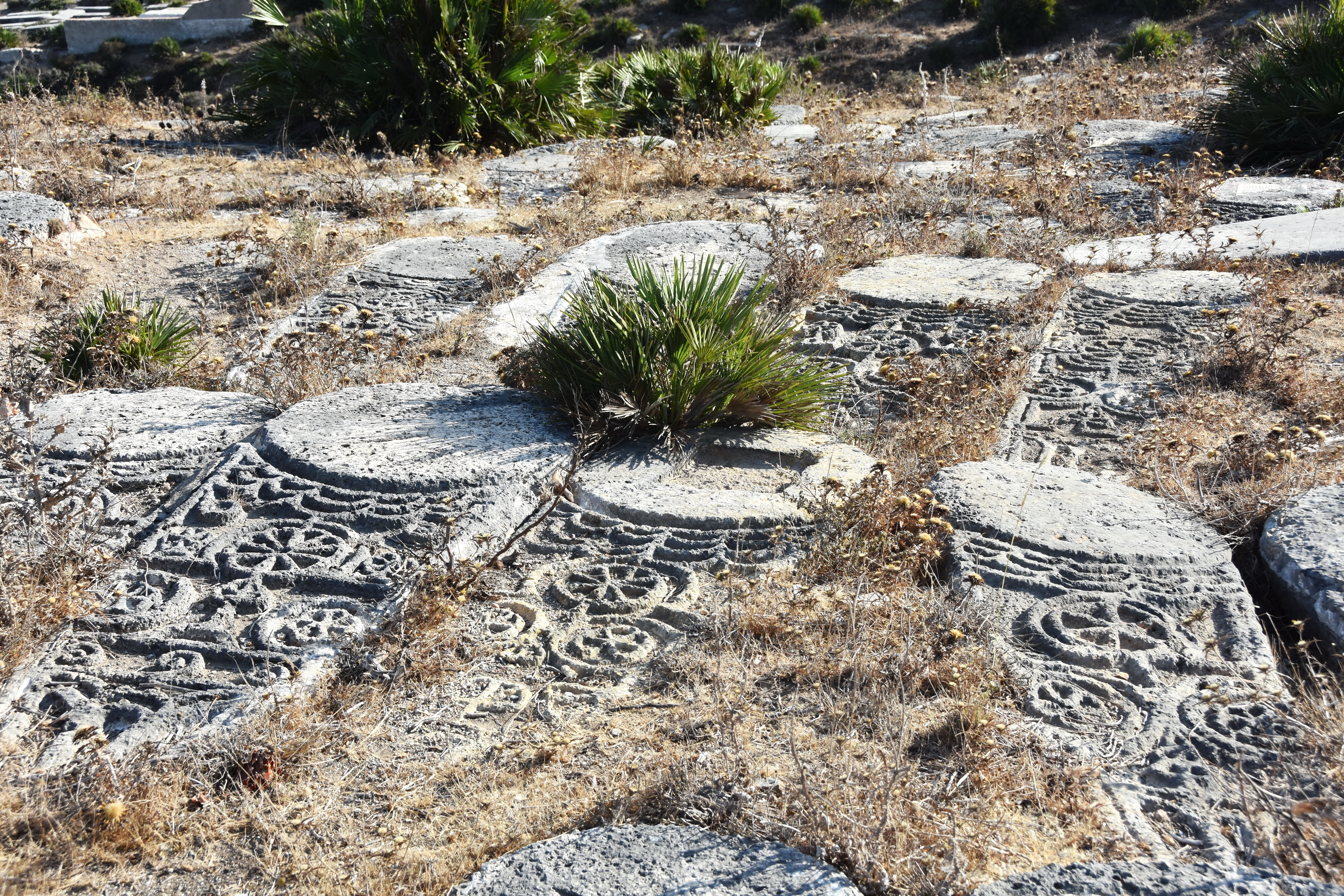
Anthropomorphic tombs in the Jewish cemetery of Tétouan

The old Jewish cemetery of Tétouan contains distinctive anthropomorphic tombstones, some of which have been dated to the 16th century.

The Jews of Tetuan had close ties with the Jews of Gibraltar, from where its founders came. There were family ties between the communities and the mutual sending of students to educational institutions[9]. There were also extensive trade relations between the communities. For many years, the Spanish authorities imposed a blockade on Gibraltar and its ongoing supplies were dependent on Morocco[10]. Morocco's only port city on the Mediterranean coast was Tetuan, and with the help of the goods that arrived from there, the Jewish merchants of Gibraltar were able to transport supplies to the citizens of the colony and to the British army.

== Notable people ==
- Rabbi Hesdai Almoshenino, Av Beit Din, author of books Chesed El and Vesmerat Hakodesh
- Rabbi Yitzhak Ben Walid, Av Beit Din and rabbi of the Jewish community of Tétouan for about 40 years
- Rabbi Yaakov Kalfon, Talmid Chakham, author of several books, including Against Kings and Yona Debi Rav
- Rabbi Amram Aborbia, who descends from the Aborbia family from Castile in Spain. He was the Chief Rabbi of Petah Tikva and a member of the Council of the Chief Rabbinate of Israel
- Daniel Yitzhak Levy, member of the Seventh Knesset
- Samuel Daniel Levy, educator and journalist, one of the leaders of Zionism in Morocco
- Mois Benarroch, writer and poet
- Esther Bendahan, Sephardic writer
- David Cazès, historian and educator who worked in Tunisia
- Blanche Bendahan, French writer from the beginning of the twentieth century
- Prof. Yaakov Bentolila, member of the Academy of the Hebrew Language
- Jacobo Israel Garzón, writer and disseminator of Jewish culture in Spain. Between 2003 and 2011 he chaired the Federation of Jewish Communities of Spain

== See also ==
- Hiloula of Rabbi Isaac Ben Walid
- Pastelitos de hoja, a Sephardic/Moroccan Jewish pastry originating in the Jewish community of Tétouan
