= Hiloula of Rabbi Isaac Ben Walid =

Anniversary of Moroccan rabbi's death

The Hiloula of Rabbi Isaac Ben Walid is the yom hillula or death celebration of Isaac Ben Walid, who died in 1870. It is one of the most popular hilluloth in North Africa.

== History ==
Ben Walid was a religious leader and worked to improve the education of the Jewish community in the city of Tétouan, founding the first-ever school of the Alliance Israélite Universelle in the city in 1862. After he died in 1870, on the 9th of Adar Sheni, 5630 in the Jewish calendar, at the age of 93, his tomb became a pilgrimage site, as well as the study room he had in the upper room of his synagogue, built in 1889 The tomb and his synagogue are visited on the anniversary of his death by Moroccan Jews from France, Israel, Panama, Venezuela, Canada and other countries where they settled. As customary in the Haketia-speaking communities of the former Spanish protectorate in Morocco, chants are sung in that variety of Judaeo-Spanish.

=== Diaspora ===
On the hiloula of Ben Walid, Moroccan Jews celebrate by singing baqashot at community centers or synagogues.

=== Legend ===
There is a legend that says that his walking stick has mystical healing powers, especially for pregnant women experiencing difficulties during their pregnancy, as well as women with fertility problems.

== See also ==
- Isaac Ben Walid Synagogue
