= Ariel Bension =

Jewish writer (born 1880)

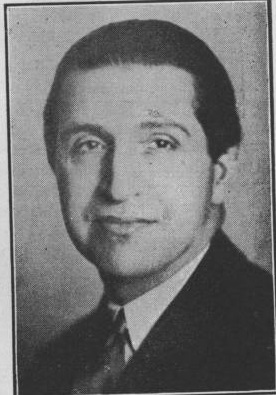
Ariel Bension

Ariel Bension (also transliterated as Ben-Zion, born May 7, 1880, in Jerusalem, Ottoman Empire; died November 9, 1932, in Neuilly-sur-Seine, French Third Republic) was a Jewish writer and Zionist activist.

== Life ==
Ariel Bension was the "son of a grand chacham of a Moroccan Kabbalist sect" and a descendant of Abraham ben Samuel ibn Hasdai ha-Levi of Barcelona.

As a young man, Bension spent some time with relatives in French North Africa and then went to Germany and Switzerland to study philosophy. He received his doctorate from the University of Bern.

Bension was a rabbi in Bitola for a year in 1913, which had belonged to the Kingdom of Serbia since 1912. Back in Palestine, he married Rahel Mizrahi and later, had a second marriage to Ida Siegler from Montreal. His estate, therefore, went to his Canadian relatives and from them to the University of Alberta.

Bension was active in Zionism and traveled to Jewish communities in the Near East, and Asia, North Africa, South America and Europe, where he campaigned for support for the Yishuv of Palestine. He participated in the Twelfth Zionist Congress in Carlsbad and the fifteenth World Zionist Congress in Basel.

Because of his historical work on the Zohar, he was appointed (corresponding) member of the Real Academia de la Historia in Madrid.

== Works ==
- The Marriage of Death. Translation Eugen Hoeflich and others. Sascha Kronburg drew the 6 pictures and the cover. Tal, Leipzig 1920.
- The Jewish Renaissance in Eretz Israel, in "The Canadian Jewish Chronicle". news.google.com.
- Ariel Bension (31 October 2017). The Zohar in Moslem and Christian Spain. Taylor & Francis. ISBN 978-1-138-68968-8. OCLC 1008875822.
- Moshe Yaacov Ben-Gavriêl; Moše Yaʿaqov Ben-Gavrîʾēl; Armin A. Wallas (1999). Armin A. Wallas (ed.). Tagebücher 1915 bis 1927. Böhlau. ISBN 978-3-205-99137-3. OCLC 1018052960.
- Saul I. Aranov; Ariel Bension; University of Alberta. Library. Special Collections Department (1979). A Descriptive Catalogue of the Bension Collection of Sephardic Manuscripts. University of Alberta. ISBN 978-0-88864-016-1. OCLC 1037908770.
- Jack Sasson Levy: "Un diamante en el camino. Vida y obra del Dr. Ariel Ben Zion", Tronix Diseño, Sonora [Mexico] 2006.
- Evri, Yuval; Behar, Almog (4 May 2017). "Between East and West: controversies over the modernization of Hebrew culture in the works of Shaul Abdallah Yosef and Ariel Bension". Journal of Modern Jewish Studies. 16 (2): 295–311. doi:10.1080/14725886.2017.1280904.
