= Pastelitos de hoja =

Moroccan Jewish pastry

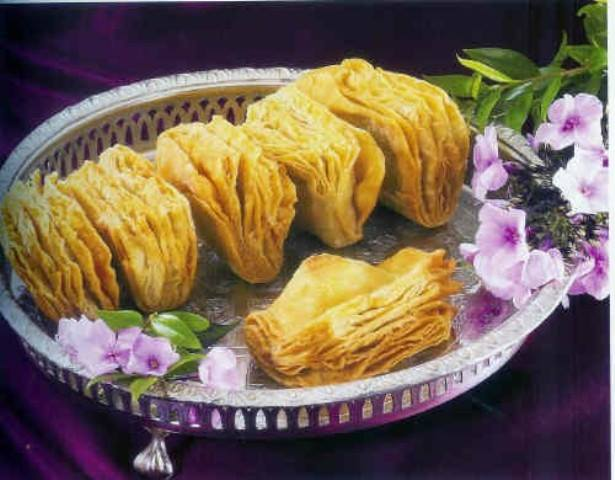
- Pastelitos de hoja
- Type: Pastry
- Course: Appetizer, dinner
- Place of origin: Currently: France, Israel, Sephardic Jewish diaspora; Originally: Jewish community of Al-Andalus, Morocco
- Created by: Sephardic Jews
- Main ingredients: Laminated dough/phyllo, margarine, or argan or olive oil, or cooking oil, ground beef, kosher salt, onions, garlic, turmeric, nutmeg, spices

Pastelitos de hoja is a Sephardic/Moroccan Jewish pastry originating in the Jewish community that formerly existed in Tetouan, Morocco.

== Overview ==
Pastelitos de hoja consists of a pastry made from a dough made from eggs, flour, salt, baking soda, margarine (to be pareve in accordance with kashrut). This dough is then rolled out and filled with a filling made from ground beef, onions, parsley, bay leaves, and spices such as turmeric, ground nutmeg. It is then brushed with an egg wash and baked.

== See also ==
- Jewish community of Tétouan
- Moroccan Jewish cuisine
