= Isaac Ben Walid Synagogue =

Orthodox synagogue in Tetuan, Morocco

- Hebrew: בית הכנסת של יצחק בן וואליד; Arabic: كنيس إسحاق بن الوليد; Spanish: Sinagoga Isaac Bengualid
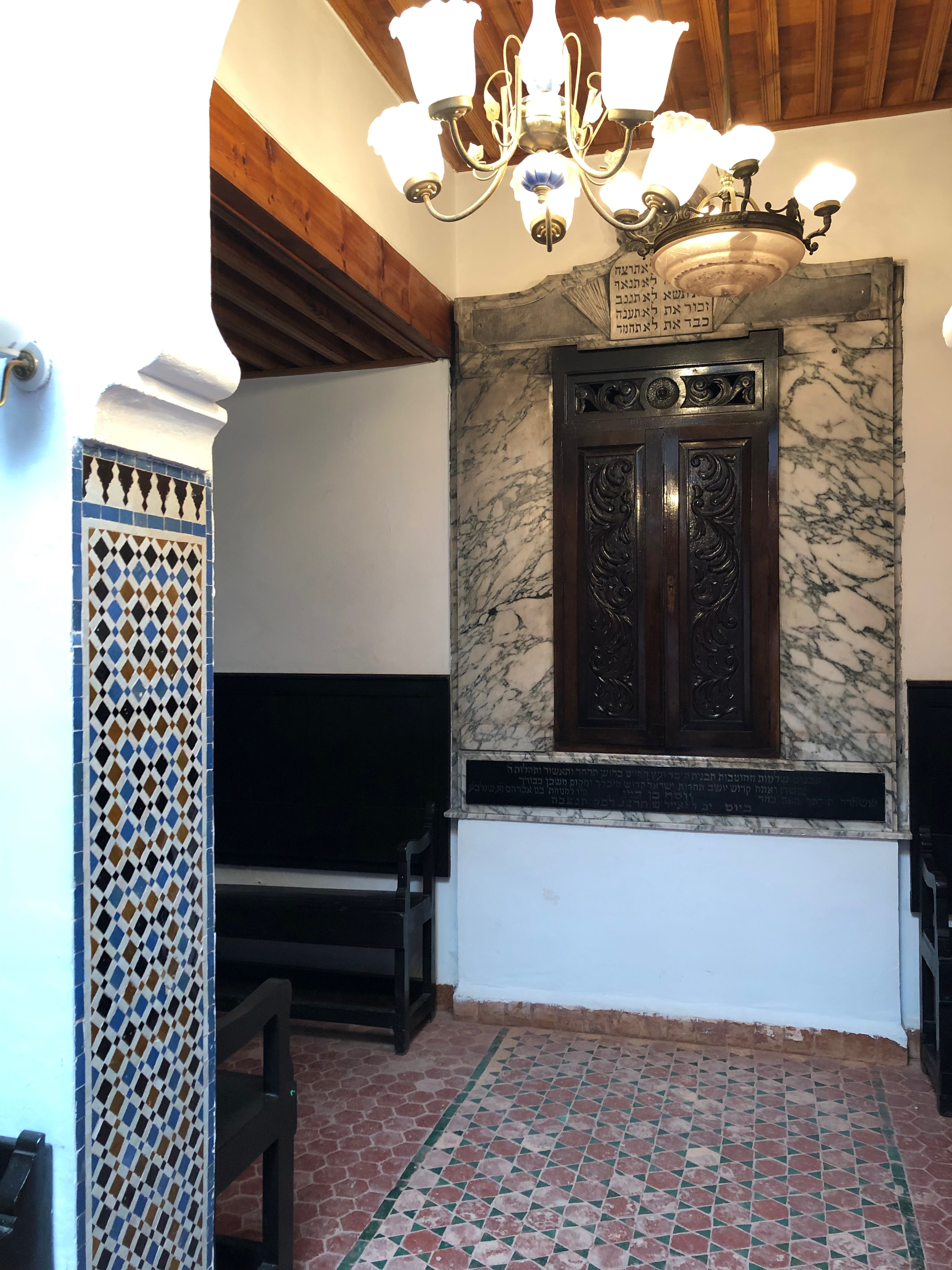
- The synagogue interior, in 2019

- Location of the synagogue in Morocco

Religion
- Affiliation: Orthodox Judaism
- Rite: Nusach Sefard
- Ecclesiastical or organizational status: Synagogue
- Status: Active (visitors only)

Location
- Location: Mellah, Tetuan
- Country: Morocco
- Interactive map of Isaac Ben Walid Synagogue
- Coordinates: 35°34′12″N 5°22′02″W

Architecture
- Type: Synagogue architecture

The Isaac Ben Walid Synagogue (Hebrew: בית הכנסת של יצחק בן וואליד; Arabic: كنيس إسحاق بن الوليد; Spanish: Sinagoga Isaac Bengualid), is an Orthodox Jewish congregation and synagogue, located in the mellah of Tetuan, Morocco.

== History ==
The synagogue is named after Rabbi Isaac Bengualid (1777–1870), author of the 2-volume Vayomer Yitzhak, a history of the Jews of Tetuan. Rabbi Bengualid was a prominent member of Tetuan's Jewish community, which comprised about 4,200 members at the time, and was considered the center of the Moroccan Sephardic community.

The Isaac Ben Walid Synagogue was built in the new mellah south of the medina of Tetuan, created when Sultan Slimane decided to build a grand mosque on the location of the old mellah. At the time, Tetuan was the heart of the Sephardi community in Morocco and it had 16 synagogues. Its second floor served as a yeshiva, and it also contained a mikveh for women and an oven for the preparation of matzah.

The synagogue held its last regular service in 1968, and it is currently only used for guided visits or for pilgrimages of former residents during hiloulot; the Moroccan Jewish Community transformed it into a museum. In 2001, the AECID and the Junta of Andalusia financed the restoration of the synagogue, in cooperation with the Municipality of Tétouan, the Foundation for Moroccan Jewish Cultural Heritage and the Bengualid family, which still owns the building.

== Gallery ==
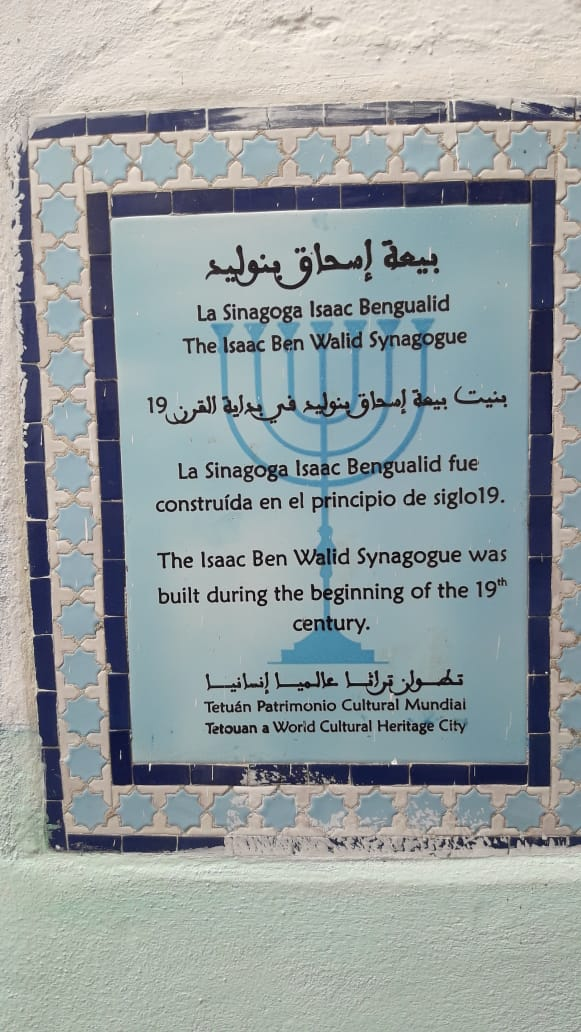
Sign at the entrance of the synagogue in Arabic, Spanish and English.

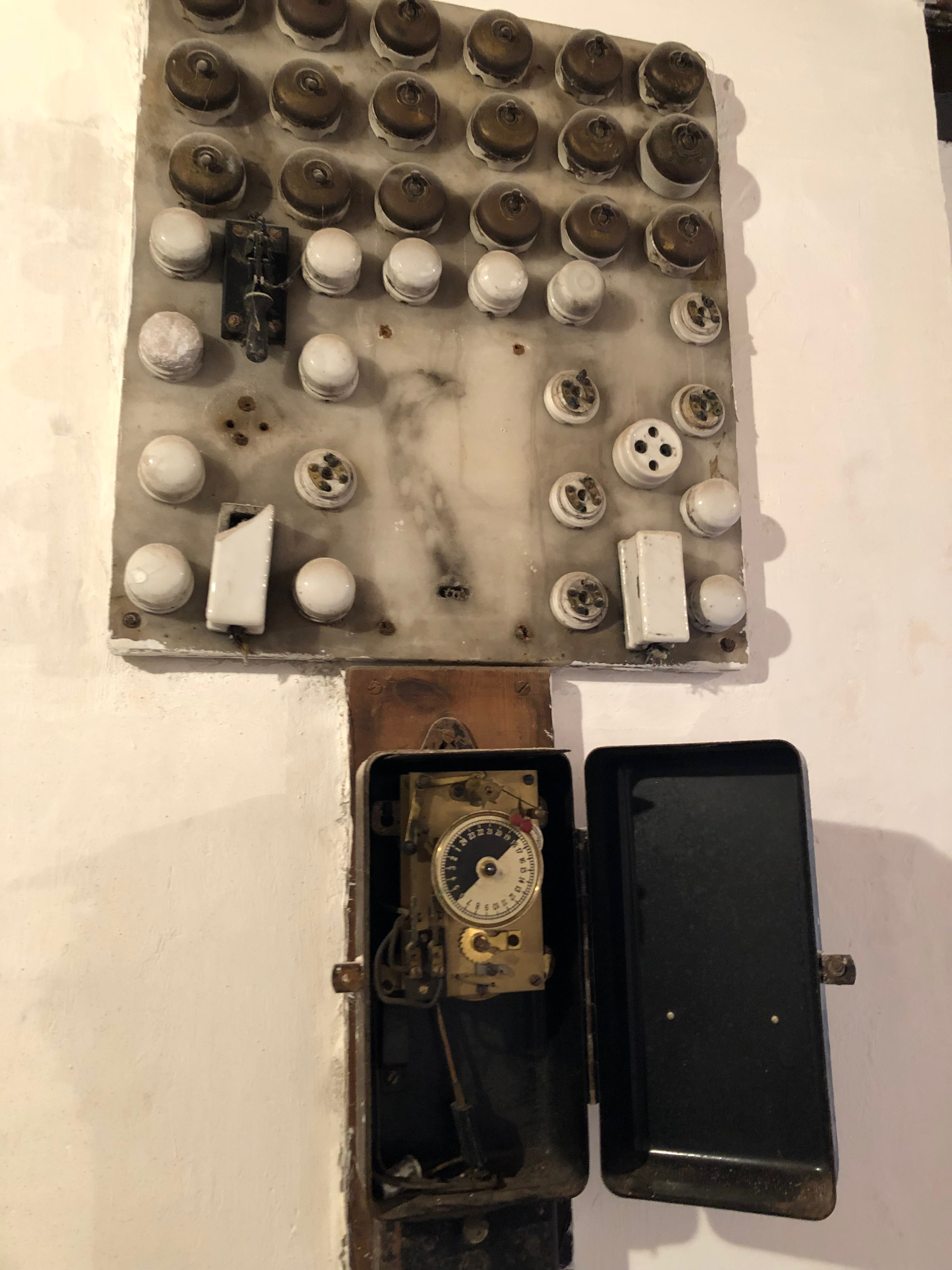
An apparatus inside the synagogue to control lights automatically for sabbath.

== See also ==
- History of the Jews in Morocco
- List of synagogues in Morocco
- Hiloula of Rabbi Isaac Ben Walid
