= Tetuani Ladino =

Dialect of Judaeo-Spanish historically spoken by Sephardic Jews in Oran, Algeria

Tetuani
- Region: now mostly Israel
- Language family: Indo-European: Italic; Latino-Faliscan; Latin; Romance; Italo-Western; Western Romance; Gallo-Iberian; Ibero-Romance; Haketia; Tetuani
- Early forms: Old Latin: Vulgar Latin; Proto-Romance; Old Spanish

Language codes
- ISO 639-3: –
- Glottolog: None
- IETF: lad-DZ

Tetuani (or Tétouani; Arabic: تطوانى; or Haketia) is a variant or dialect of Haketia, a form of Ladino (Judaeo-Spanish)—Ibero-Romance as spoken by Sephardic Jews—associated with and historically spoken by Tétouani Jews, a Sephardic community with ties to the city of Tétouan in Morocco. It contained Arabic and Hebrew elements.

== re-Hispanisation ==
Spanish as spoken by the Jewish community of Tetuan went through a process of re-Hispanisation starting in the 19th century, whereby various linguistic aspects of Haketia were influenced by Castilian Spanish. According to Isaac Guershon, this process was sustained by Jewish merchants' commerce between western Mediterranean cities, especially between Tetuan and Gibraltar. Tetuani Jews came to pronounces 's' and 'j' according to the new Castilian pronunciation, for example.

This process was greatly accelerated by the Hispano-Moroccan War (1859–1860) and the Spanish occupation of Tetuan (February 6, 1860 – May 1862). According to Moisés Orfali, the establishment of the Spanish protectorate in northern Morocco was the "mortal blow" to Haketia, and by the 1920s, texts published about Haketia could be considered documentation of a dying language.

The Asociación Hispanojudía de Tetuan sought to teach 'pure Castilian'.

== In Oran ==
Following the French conquest of Algeria, a number of northern Moroccan and especially Tetuani Jews migrated to the port city of Oran. Tetuani was used to refer to the Haketia spoken in that city.

== See also ==
- Haketia
