= José Benoliel =

Moroccan writer (1858–1937)

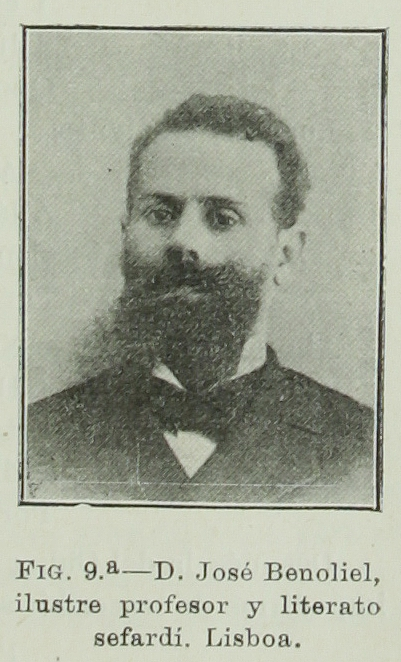
- Benoliel in 1905
- Born: 1857; Tangier, Morocco
- Died: 1937 (aged 79–80); Tangier, Morocco
- Education: Alliance Israélite Universelle
- Occupations: Writer and translator
- Years active: 1881–1921

José Benoliel (1857–1937), also known as Joseph Benoliel, was a Luso-Moroccan writer, educator and translator.

== Early life and work as an educator ==
Benoliel was born in Tangier to a Moroccan-Jewish family. He had a brother, Salomon. In 1859, his family went to Spain for refuge during the Hispano–Moroccan War. They returned to Tangier in 1860 when the war had ended.

He studied at the Alliance Israélite Universelle in addition to studying at yeshiva in Morocco. He completed his education at the AIU école in Paris. He was a teacher during his early years out of school at Mikveh Israel in Jaffa, then-part of the Ottoman Empire. He also worked in Tangier and Mogador. In 1881, he moved to Lisbon, where he became naturalized portuguese, working as a language teacher in French, Hebrew, and Arabic until his retirement in 1921.

In 1887 Benoliel began as an instructor of French at the Escola Industrial Marquês de Pombal. On March 17, 1888, he was authorized by the council of the Higher Course of Letters to teach a free course in Hebrew, which ran from 1888 to 1891. In 1907, he was appointed to the position of Corresponding Academian for the Royal Spanish Academy.

From 1912 to 1916, he was a member of the Committee of the Jewish Community of Lisbon, and was the writer for their circulating bulletin. Moisés Bensabat Amzalak was a fellow secretary on the bulletin, and in an article that Amzalak wrote on Benoliel for Encyclopaedia Judaica, he stated that he was an official translator for the Portuguese Ministry of Foreign Affairs.

After retirement in 1921, he returned to Tangier, where he became president of the local Jewish community. He supervised a three years-long project for the creation of a modern rabbinical seminary with a curriculum of both religious subjects as well as the secular sciences.

== Literary contributions ==
In addition to teaching, Benoliel was an inventor who was passionate about precision mechanics. In this field, he designed a Braille typewriter for the blind, and devices for writing in several alphabets. He is best-known for his written work, including textbooks and dictionaries. He wrote literary works of his own, as well as translating works between various languages.

He published several didactic books for the teaching of languages, including a French to Portuguese illustrated dictionary and a book of the elements of French grammar. He published many collectionf of popular oral literature, including Frases y dichos de la jacquetíao and Sephardic sayings from northern Morocco. He translated several literary works from Portuguese to French, and produced a compilation of Jewish religious texts into Spanish titled Porat Yosef. He wrote his own, original poetry in Portuguese, French, and Hebrew.

In 1893, one of his two contributions to the Tenth International Congress of Orientalists was published by the Lisbon Geographic Society. It was called Inês de Castro. Épisode des Lusiades. Traduction en vers hébreux, and had a preface by Luciano Cordeiro. He contributed to the same society in 1898 with the publication of Fábulas de Loqmán: vertidas em Portuguez e paraphraseadas em versos hebraicos in commemoration for the 4-century anniversary of the Portuguese discovery of India. On the same date, he had successful publications of Lyricas de Luiz de Camões com Traducções Francezas e Castelhanas and Episodio do Gigante Adamastor – Estudo critico.

== Sephardi community ==
Benoliel worked as a correspondent for Spanish publicist Ángel Pulido, a politician interested in the Sephardic Jewish community. He sent him detailed information about Sephardic communities in Portugal, and due to this relationship he became a close collaborator of Ramón Menéndez Pidal. From 1904 to 1913, Benoliel send Pidal more than 150 versions of romances from Tangier and Tetouan, which he had collected from the Sephardic community in Lisbon. The two published and article together on one of the most widespread dirges among Moroccan Sephardim, which derived from a 15th-century Spanish text. Additionally, Benoliel is the author of an elaborate study of the haquetía, a Moroccan variety of Judaeo-Spanish. It was published in installments in 1926 in the Bulletin of the Royal Spanish Academy, when Menéndez Pidal was director.

== Bibliography ==
- Benoliel, José (1898). Episodio do gigante Adamastor: Lusiadas, canto v, est. XXXVII-LXX (in Brazilian Portuguese). Imprensa nacional.
- Benoliel, José (1904). Endecha de los Judíos Españoles de Tanger (in Spanish).
- Benoliel, José (1918). Les surhommes au carcan: Mané, Thécel, Pharès. 2ème partie (in French). Typographia do Annuario commercial.
- Benoliel, José (1926). Dialecto judeo-hispano-marroquí o hakitía (in Spanish).
- Benoliel, José (1933). A los antisemitas (in Spanish). typ. F. Erola.
- Benoliel, José (1961). O grande jejum: sermão proferido em 1923 na Sinagoga Hes Haim (in Portuguese). Editorial Império.
- Benoliel, José; Manuguerra, Henri (1978). Mise en page et impression automatiques des textes fondées sur la reconnaissance de leur structure (système Aurore) (in French).
- Benoliel, José; Israel Garzón, Jacobo (2011). Frases y dichos de la jaquetía. Madrid: Hebraica ediciones. ISBN 978-84-615-5339-6.
- Benoliel, José; Israel Garzón, Jacobo (2012). Refranes sefardíes del norte de Marruecos. Madrid: Hebraica Ediciones. ISBN 978-84-615-5343-3. OCLC 795156864.
