= Nehemia de Lieme =

Dutch banker and Zionist (1882–1940)

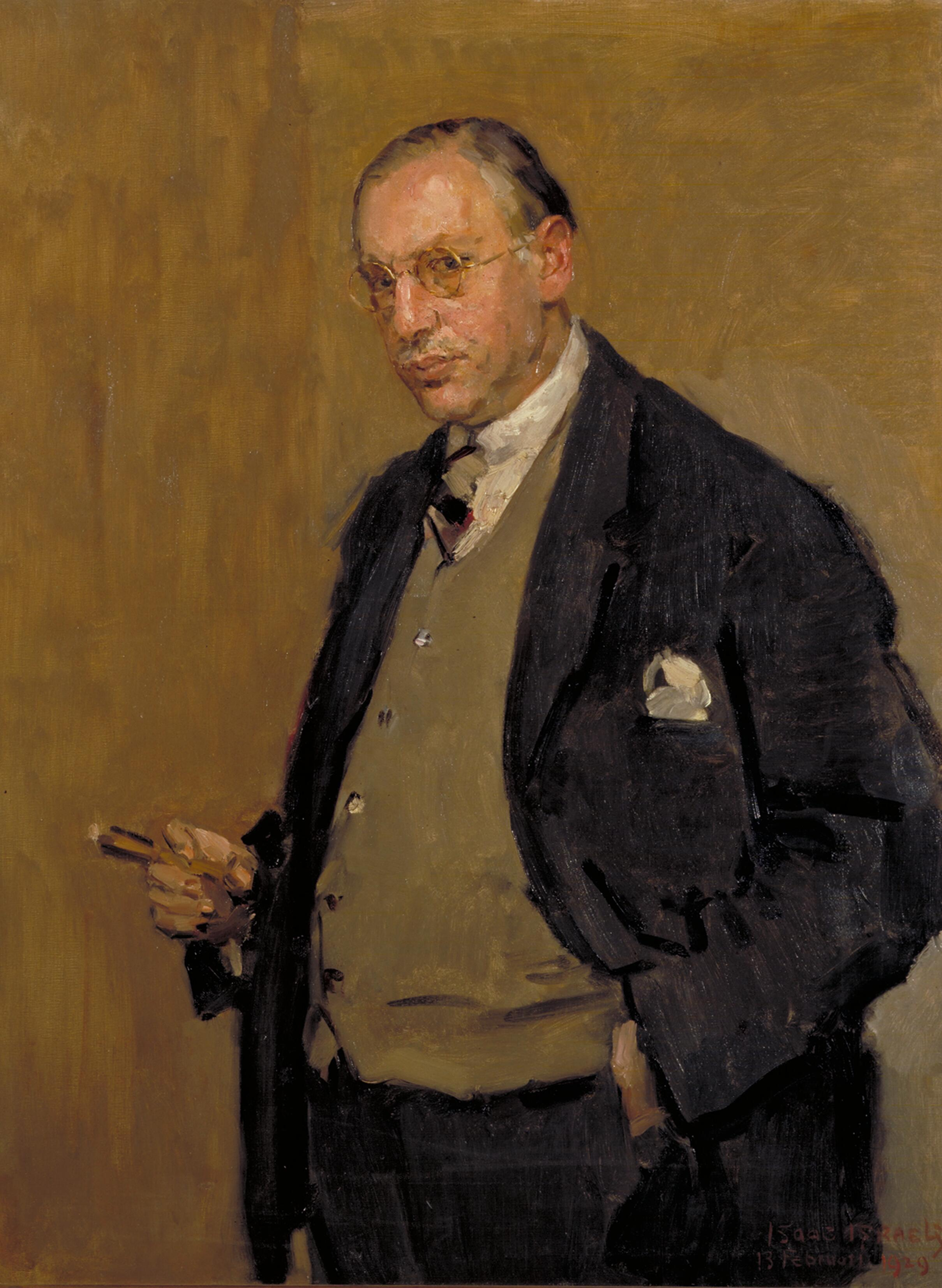
- De Lieme (portrait by Isaac Israels)
- Born: 26 March 1882; The Hague, Netherlands
- Died: 24 June 1940 (aged 58); The Hague, Netherlands
- Occupation: Banker
- Known for: Major Dutch Zionist leader and founder of De Centrale

Nehemia de Lieme (26 March 1882 – 24 June 1940) was a Dutch banker, founder of the insurance company De Centrale, a financier of socio-cultural institutions and the International Institute of Social History (IISH) and a major Zionist leader in the Netherlands.

== Youth and education ==
Nehemia de Lieme was born in The Hague into an Orthodox Jewish family. He was the son of Aaltje Goudsmit and Benjamin de Lieme, who served as a religious teacher and ritual slaughterer. At the age of fourteen, he began working as a junior clerk at the Edersheim brokerage firm in The Hague. This role laid the foundation for both his financial expertise and his interest in Zionism.

== Netherlands Zionist Federation ==
De Lieme became a member of the Netherlands Zionist Federation (Dutch: Nederlandse Zionistenbond, NZB) in 1907. He served as the chairman of the NZB from 1912 to 1918 and resigned again in 1924. Around 1914, he was a member of a committee of Dutch Jews established to assist Jewish refugees in Alexandria. The committee was formed to aid more than 11,000 Jews who had been deported to Alexandria in 1914, primarily from Jaffa, which was then part of the Ottoman Empire. Both in the years he held office and in those he did not, it is said that he had the 'final say' in the organization.

Between 1919 and 1921, he served as the chairman of the Jewish National Fund, which he left following a disagreement on a land purchase. In 1920, he formulated the land policy of the JNF. He was also elected that year as a member of the Zionist Executive Committee, from which he was dismissed just a year later in 1921.

Adopting a stance similar to supporters of Louis Brandeis, he prioritized making Palestine economically viable, famously auditing the financial records of kibbutzim rather than praising their pioneering labor. This clinical approach made him a persona non grata among local settlers and ultimately prompted him to cancel his family's planned Aliya.

Disagreeing with the direction of the Netherlands Zionist Federation, he withdrew from the movement in 1937. Due to his practical approach and drive, he was later described as "the most important figure that Zionism in the Netherlands ever produced."

== De Centrale ==
De Centrale was founded as a Dutch insurance company in 1904 by Nehemia de Lieme. The organization aimed to economically and culturally strengthen the labor movement. The company's statutes stipulated that profits must exclusively benefit the social-democratic movement. Furthermore, it was required that the initiators and shareholders be active members or sympathizers of the social-democratic movement. While De Lieme supported socialist theory, he was often repelled by its practical application. Other figures involved in the founding of De Centrale included SDAP Member of Parliament Gerrit Melchers, Jan Oudegeest, and A. Harms. For the first few years, the bank was located at the address of De Lieme's parental home. De Lieme led De Centrale until his death in 1940.

== International Institute of Social History ==
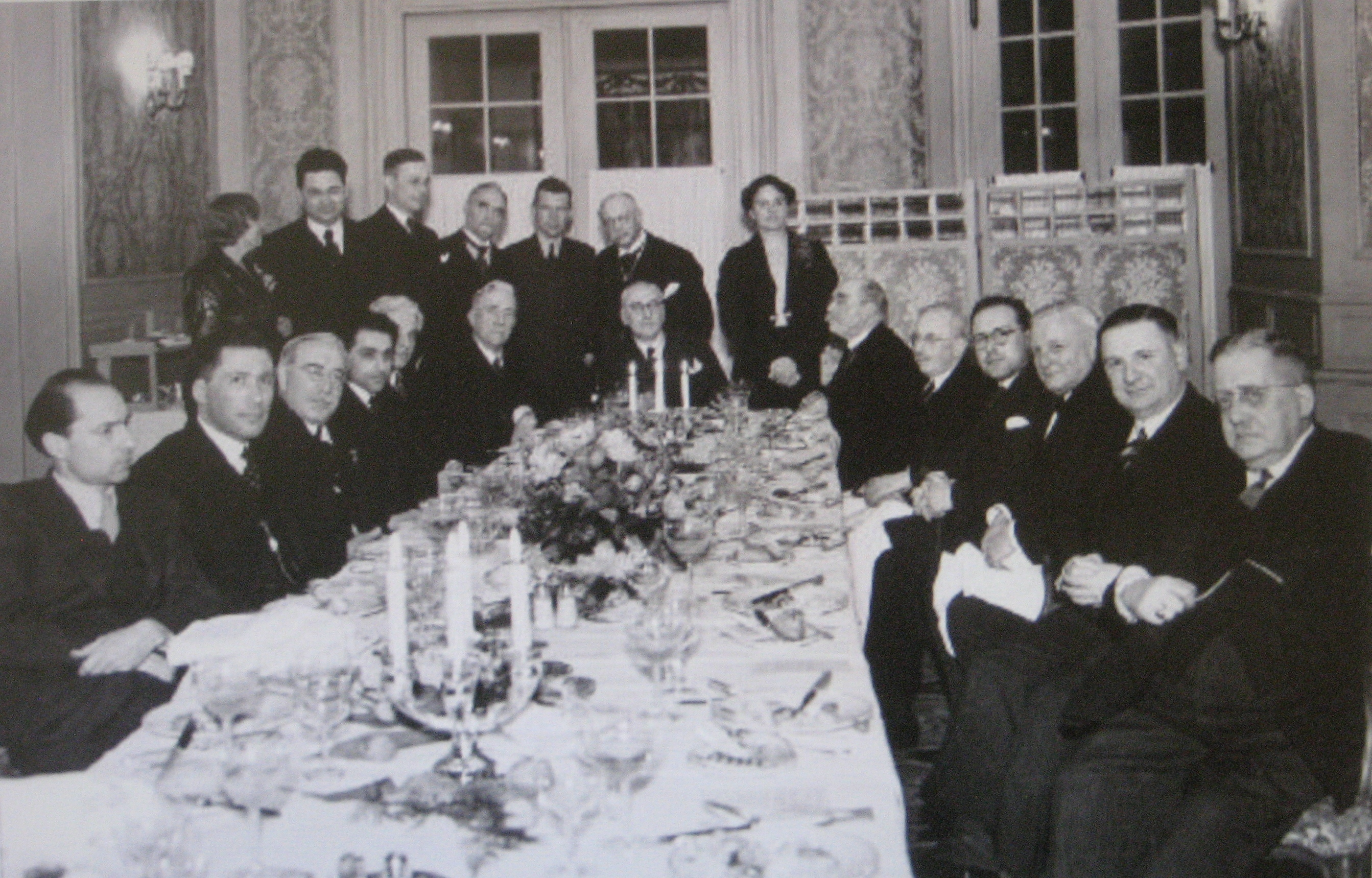
Dinner at the founding of the IISH, 1937. De Lieme is standing, second from the right.

De Lieme demonstrated his social commitment and interest in history in various other ways. In the 1930s, he repeatedly provided funds to Nicolaas Posthumus for the housing of foreign archives and libraries in Amsterdam. This led to the founding of the International Institute of Social History (IISH) in 1935, where De Lieme became the first chairman of the board. Under his leadership, several important archives were acquired by the IISH.

== Family ==
In March 1908, De Lieme married Rebecca Kahn (1883–1939). Their son, Ezra, was murdered in the Sobibor extermination camp in 1943. Their daughter, Adèle Violetta Hanna (1908–1982), survived the war. Nehemia de Lieme himself passed away on 24 June 1940, "as a result of a debilitating, long-term illness."

== Legacy ==
The kibbutz Sde Nehemia in the Hula Valley in Galilee was named after Nehemia de Lieme in the 1940s.

== Selected publications by De Lieme ==
- Het ontwerp van wet tot regeling van het levensverzekeringsbedrijf. Kritische beschouwingen. (The draft law for the regulation of the life insurance business. Critical considerations.) The Hague, 1921.
- Het zwervende volk (The wandering people). Arnhem, 1915. (Digital version)
- De "Centrale Werkgevers Risicobank", hare verkeerde organisatie en onvoldoend gedekte obligatieleening (The "Central Employers' Risk Bank", its wrong organization and insufficiently covered bond loan). The Hague, Passage-Boekhandel, 1902.

== Selected publications about De Lieme ==
- Evelien Gans: De kleine verschillen die het leven uitmaken. Een historische studie naar joodse sociaal-democraten en socialistisch-zionisten in Nederland (The small differences that make up life. A historical study of Jewish social democrats and socialist-Zionists in the Netherlands). (Thesis). Amsterdam, 1999.
- Abel Herzberg: De man in de spiegel (The man in the mirror). Amsterdam, 1980.
- Ludy Giebels: De Zionistische beweging in Nederland, 1899-1941 (The Zionist movement in the Netherlands, 1899–1941). (Thesis). Assen, 1975.
