= Haketia =

Form of Judaeo-Spanish historically spoken by Sephardim in North Africa

- Hakitia, Haquitía, Western Judeo-Spanish
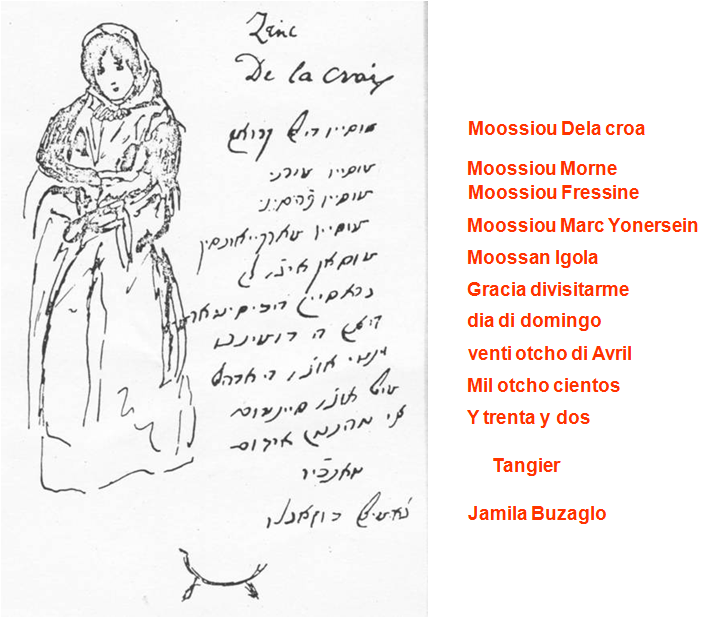
- An original letter in Solitreo script from Tangier, written in 1832.
- Pronunciation: [ħakeˈti.a]
- Native to: Morocco
- Region: The Maghreb, Spain (Ceuta and Melilla), Israel, Amazonas state in Brazil
- Ethnicity: North African Sephardic Jews
- Native speakers: 1,000 (2023)
- Language family: Indo-European: Italic; Latino-Faliscan; Latin; Romance; Italo-Western; Western Romance; Gallo-Iberian; Ibero-Romance; West Iberian; Castilian; Judeo-Spanish; Haketia
- Early forms: Old Latin: Vulgar Latin; Proto-Romance; Old Spanish
- Dialects: Tetuani Ladino
- Writing system: Originally, Hebrew (typically either Rashi or Solitreo); now, mostly Latin

Language codes
- ISO 639-3: –
- IETF: lad-015
- Historical Judeo-Spanish speech communities in the Mediterranean. Ringed circles represent modern speech communities. Haketia is spoken on the southwest Mediterranean.

Haketia (Hebrew: חַכִּיתִּיָה Ḥakkītīyā; Arabic: الحَكِيتِيَةُ al-Ḥakītiya; Spanish: Haquetía) (also written as Hakitia or Haquitía) is a Jewish ethnolect and Romance language also known as Djudeo Spañol, Ladino Occidental, or Western Judaeo-Spanish. It is an endangered language that was historically spoken by the North African Sephardim in the Moroccan cities of Tétouan, Tangier, Asilah, Larache, Chefchaouen, Ksar el-Kebir, Casablanca (by migrants from northern cities) and the Spanish cities of Ceuta, and Melilla. Tétouani Ladino was also spoken in Oran, Algeria. One of the distinctions between Ladino and Haketia (Haquetia) is that the latter incorporates many elements of Moroccan Arabic.

== Etymology ==
The name "Haketia" is derived from the Arabic حَكَى ḥakā, "tell", and is therefore pronounced with [ħ], reflecting the Arabic ح ḥāʾ. In some places it is written "Jaquetía" with the same pronunciation.

== Description ==
The well-known form of Judaeo-Spanish spoken by Jews living in the Balkans, Greece, Turkey and Jerusalem is Ladino Oriental (eastern Ladino). Haketia may be described by contrast as Ladino Occidental. The language is a variety of Spanish that borrows heavily from Judeo-Moroccan Arabic. It evidently also contains a number of words of Hebrew origin and was originally written using Hebrew letters. There is some cultural resemblance between the two Judaeo-Spanish dialect communities, including a rich shared stock of romanzas (ballads) from medieval Spain, though both words and music often differ in detail (as indeed they do between one Oriental-Sephardic community and another).

The Haketia lexicon is made up mostly of Spanish words but 34.5% of words are from Arabic and 18.5% are from Hebrew. It contains many calques of Hebrew phrases, such as hiĵas de Israel, a literal translation of the Hebrew phrase בנות ישראל, meaning "daughters of Israel".

Other words have shifted in meaning. For example, שכן [ʃaˈχen], "neighbor", became sajén, which has taken on the meaning "Christian/Spanish".

Spanish prefixes and suffixes are combined with Hebrew base words.

== Phonology ==
Characteristics of Haketia's phonology include:

- The pharyngeal fricatives ḥ /ħ/ and ˁ /ʕ/ in words with Arabic or Hebrew roots. For example: ya ḥasrá /ja ħasˈɾa/ ('those were the days!', from Moroccan Arabic يا حسرة /jaː ħasˈɾa/), yˁatik /jʕaˈtik/ ('will give you', from Moroccan Arabic يعاطيك /jʕaːˈtˤiːk/), ḥanukía /ħanuˈki.a/ ('Hanukkiah', from Hebrew חֲנֻכִּיָּה /ħănukkijˈjaː/); Maˁarab /maʕaˈɾab/ ('Morocco', from Hebrew מַעֲרָב 'west' /maʕăˈɾaːv/).
- The glottal fricative /h/ (frequently voiced [ɦ]) in Hebrew words, like in kehiŀlá /kehilˈla/ ('community', from Hebrew קְהִלָּה /qəhilˈlaː), or Arabic words, like in haraĵ /haˈɾaʒ/ ('uproar', from Moroccan Arabic هرج). An etymological <h> written but no longer pronounced in modern Spanish may be retained in Haketia: hazer /haˈzeɾ/ ('to do'. cf. Modern Spanish hacer /aˈθeɾ/). Word-medial sequences of vowels in hiatus in words of Spanish origin are sometimes interrupted by the insertion of /h/: dihablo /diˈhablo/ ('devil', cf. Spanish diablo /ˈdjablo/) or /ʔ/: ma'uyar /maʔuˈjaɾ/ ('to meow', cf. Spanish maullar /mauˈʎaɾ/). The glottal stop is also sometimes added word-initially to reinforce exclamations or words of encouragement of Spanish origin: 'ay! /ʔaj/ ('alas!', cf. Spanish ay /aj/), 'anda! /ˈʔanda/ ('go on!', cf. Spanish anda /ˈanda/), 'arsa /ˈʔaɾsa/ ('lift it!', cf. Spanish alza /ˈalθa/). On the other hand /ʔ/ is lost in borrowings from Hebrew: gueuŀlá /ɡeulˈla/ ('redemption [of the Jewish people]', from Hebrew גְּאֻלָּה /gəʔulˈlaː/).
- The profusion of gemination, especially in loanwords from Arabic or Hebrew, even when absent in the original form, as in berajjá /beɾaxˈxa/ ('blessing', from Hebrew בְּרָכָה /bəɾaːˈxaː/) and azzul /azˈzul/ ('blue', cf. Spanish azul /aˈθul/); also, by consonantal assimilation, at word boundaries, like in salimos de Pésaḥ /saˈlimos de ˈpesaħ/ → salímod-de Pésaḥ [saˈlimodde ˈpesaħ] ('at the end of Passover', lit. 'we exited Passover').
- Words from Moroccan Arabic maintain their original form even when it contradicts the phonotactic rules of Spanish: ghzal /ɣzal/ ('handsome young person', from Moroccan Arabic غزال /ɣzaːl/ 'gazelle, beautiful'), kbir /kbiɾ/ ('notable, chief', from Moroccan Arabic كبير /kbiːɾ/ 'big, great'), ghrib /ɣɾib/ ('foreigner', from Moroccan Arabic غريب /ɣɾiːb/), ḥram /ħɾam/ ('forbidden', from Moroccan Arabic حرام /ħɾaːm/).
- The phonemes /b/, /d/, and /ɡ/ are pronounced as voiced stops only after a pause, after a nasal consonant, when they are geminated or—in the case of /d/—after a lateral consonant; in all other contexts, they are realized as fricatives (namely [β, ð, ɣ]) or approximants. The velar fricative gh /ɣ/ also appears as a phoneme in words from Arabic: guer /geɾ/ ('proselyte', from Hebrew גֵּר /geːɾ/) vs. gher /ɣeɾ/ ('only', from Moroccan Arabic غير /ɣiːɾ/).
- The Pharyngealized consonants of Moroccan Arabic and Hebrew (/sˤ/, /dˤ/, /tˤ/) are borrowed as regular consonants (/s/, /d/, /t/): saddik /sadˈdik/ ('saint', from Hebrew צַדִּיק /sˤadˈdiːq/), qaddear /qaddeˈaɾ/ ('to finish, to terminate', from Moroccan Arabic قضى /qdˤa/), terefá /teɾeˈfa/ ('treif', from Hebrew טְרֵפָה /tˤəɾeːˈfaː/).
- /q/ and /w/ are retained in borrowings from Arabic, but change to /k/ and /v/ in borrowings from Hebrew: qaddear /qaddeˈaɾ/ vs. kehiŀlá /kehilˈla/, waḥsh /waħʃ/ ('nostalgia, longing, missing', from Moroccan Arabic وحش) vs. vadday /vadˈdaj/ ('for sure, of course', from Hebrew וַדַּאי /wadˈdaj/).
- Like other dialects of Judeo-Spanish, Haketia has Seseo and Yeísmo: corassón /koɾasˈson/ ('heart', cf. Spanish corazón /koɾaˈθon/), buya /ˈbuja/ ('rowdiness, racket, ruckus', cf. Spanish bulla /ˈbuʎa/).
- Texts written in Hebrew letters show occurrences of a trilled /r/, as in אוררורוסו /oroˈɾoso/ ('dreadful', cf. Spanish horroroso). In this respect Spanish influence is widespread in Haketia speech, as evidenced in Marruecos /maˈrwekos/ ('Morocco'). Older texts show occurrences of a simple alveolar tap /ɾ/: טיירה /ˈtjeɾa/ ('earth, ground, land', cf. Spanish tierra /ˈtjera/).
- The voiced sibilant /z/, not only in Hebrew or Arabic words but also in the realization of an original /s/ as a result of assimilation between vowels: laz alegríaz /laz aleˈgɾi.az/ ('the joys', cf. Modern Spanish las alegrías /las aleˈgɾi.as/); this /z/ can evolve in a second phase from sibilant to an interdental fricative [ð]: mozotros /moˈzotɾos/ → [moˈðotɾos] ('we').
- Under the influence of Moroccan Arabic phonology, the Old Spanish [ʒ] and [dʒ] allophones of the /dʒ/ phoneme merged in Haketia as /ʒ/: ĵudió /ʒuˈdjo/ ('Jew', cf. Eastern Ladino djudyó /dʒuˈdjo/ or djidyó /dʒiˈdjo/).
- Like other dialects of Judeo-Spanish, Haketia has retained the postalveolar sibilants of Old Spanish, the voiced ĵ /ʒ/ as in hiĵas /ˈiʒas/ ('daughters', cf. modern Spanish hijas /ˈixas/) and muĵer /muˈʒeɾ/ ('wife, woman', cf. modern Spanish mujer /muˈxeɾ/) and the unvoiced sh /ʃ/ as in shabón /ʃaˈbon/ ('soap', cf. modern Spanish jabón /xaˈbon/) and enshawar /enʃaˈwaɾ/ ('to rinse', cf. modern Spanish enjuagar /enxwaˈgaɾ/); but in spoken Haketia, influenced by modern Spanish <j>, most of these cases are sometimes pronounced as the voiceless velar fricative [x]. /ʃ/ is also a phoneme in Haketia in words of Arabic or Hebrew origin; often it is pronounced [s], principally by women: shabbat shalom /ʃabˈbat ʃaˈlom/ → sabbat salom [sabˈbat saˈlom] ('Shabbat shalom', from Hebrew שַׁבָּת שָׁלוֹם /ʃabˈbaːθ ʃaːˈloːm/); kiddush /kidˈduʃ/ → kiddús [kidˈdus] ('Kiddush' from Hebrew קִדּוּשׁ /qidˈduːʃ/), etc.; next to a voiced consonant, this [s] can become [z]: ḥeshván /ħeʃˈvan/ → ḥezván [ħezˈvan] ('Cheshvan', from Hebrew חֶשְׁוָן /ħeʃˈwaːn/). On the other hand [ʃ] can also be the realization of an /s/ before a /k/ as in moshca [ˈmoʃka] ('fly', cf. Spanish mosca /ˈmoska/), and bushcar [buʃˈkaɾ] ('to look at', cf. Spanish buscar /busˈkaɾ/).
- Bilabial consonants become velars before /w/: güeno /ˈgweno/ ~ ueno /ˈweno/ ('good', cf. Spanish bueno /ˈbweno/), cuerta /ˈkweɾta/ ('door, gate', cf. Spanish puerta /ˈpweɾta/).
- Labialization of velar consonants when after /u(n)/ and before /a/: ḥanukká /ħanukˈka/ → ḥanukkwá [ħanukˈkwa] ('Hanukkah', from Hebrew חֲנֻכָּה /ħănukˈkaː/), ukuán /uˈkwan/ ('only, nothing more', from Moroccan Arabic وكان /wkaːn/), nuncua /ˈnunkwa/ ('never', cf. Spanish nunca /ˈnunka/), ĵuguada /ʒuˈɡwada/ ('play, move, turn', cf. Spanish jugada /xuˈɡada/).
- Coalescence of the cluster /nj/ into the palatal nasal /ɲ/: quiñentos /kiˈɲentos/ ('five hundred', cf. Spanish quinientos /kiˈnjentos/).
- Reduction of /j/ after a stressed /i/: maravía /maɾaˈbi.a/ ('wonder', cf. Spanish maravilla /maɾaˈbiʎa/).
- In some communities, particularly in Tétouan, consonant elision: poned /poˈned/ → poné [poˈne] ('put [2PL.IMP]'), comites /koˈmites/ → comite [koˈmite] ('you ate').

=== Consonant Phonemes ===
		Bilabial	Labiodental	Dental	Alveolar	Post- alveolar	Palatal	Labiovelar	Velar	Uvular	Pharyngeal	Glottal
Nasal		m			n		ɲ					
Stop/Affricate	Voiceless	p		t		tʃ			k	q		ʔ
Stop/Affricate	Voiced	b		d					g			
Fricative	Voiceless		f		s	ʃ			x		ħ	h
Fricative	Voiced	(β)	v	(ð)	z	ʒ	j		ɣ		ʕ	(ɦ)
Approximant		(β)		(ð)	l		j	w	ɣ		ʕ	(ɦ)
Tap					ɾ							
Trill					r							

=== Vowel Phonemes ===
	Front	Central	Back
Close	i		u
Mid	e		o
Open		a	

== Morphology ==
- Native words form the plural by suffixing the morpheme |-s| (which corresponds to /-s/ in words ending with unstressed vowels and /-es/ otherwise). Masculine nouns loaned from Hebrew typically form the plural by suffixing the morpheme |-ˈim|, though some use |-ˈot| instead. For instance, the plural of masculine sefer 'book' is safarim, whereas the plural of masculine mazón 'victual' is mezonot. Feminine nouns loaned from Hebrew usually form the plural with |-ˈot|, though some use |-ˈim| instead.
- The dual number only appears in nouns loaned from Hebrew in certain verses, such as "Mosé subió a los shamaim" ("Moses rose to the two heavens"). These nouns form the dual number by suffixing the morpheme |-ˈaim|.

=== Verb Conjugation ===
Regular conjugations:

	-ar verbs	-er verbs	-ir verbs
Infinitive	-ar	-er	-ir
Gerund	-ando	-iendo	
Participle	-ado	-ido	

Present Indicative: Singular
	-ar verbs	-er verbs	-ir verbs
First Person	-oy		
Second Person	-as	-es	
Third Person	-a	-e	

Present Indicative: Plural
	-ar verbs	-er verbs	-ir verbs
First Person	-amos	-emos	
Second Person	-ais	-ís	
Third Person	-an	-en	

Imperfect Indicative: Singular
	-ar verbs	-er verbs	-ir verbs
First Person	-aba	-ía	
Second Person	-abas	-ías	
Third Person	-aba	-ía	

Imperfect Indicative: Plural
	-ar verbs	-er verbs	-ir verbs
First Person	-abamos	-iamos	
Second Person	-abais	-íais	
Third Person	-aban	-ían	

Preterite Indicative: Singular
	-ar verbs	-er verbs	-ir verbs
First Person	-í		
Second Person	-átes	-ítes	
Third Person	-ó	-ió	

Preterite Indicative: Plural
	-ar verbs	-er verbs	-ir verbs
First Person	-ímos		
Second Person	-átis	-ítis	
Third Person	-aron	-ieron	

Future Indicative: Singular
	-ar verbs	-er verbs	-ir verbs
First Person	-aré	-eré	-iré
Second Person	-arás	-erás	-irás
Third Person	-ará	-erá	-irá

Future Indicative: Plural
	-ar verbs	-er verbs	-ir verbs
First Person	-arémos	-erémos	-irémos
Second Person	-arís	-erís	-irís
Third Person	-arán	-erán	-irán

Singular Conditional
	-ar verbs	-er verbs	-ir verbs
First Person	-aría	-ería	-iría
Second Person	-arías	-erías	-irías
Third Person	-aría	-ería	-iría

Plural Conditional
	-ar verbs	-er verbs	-ir verbs
First Person	-ariamos	-eriamos	-iriamos
Second Person	-aríais	-eríais	-iríais
Third Person	-arían	-erían	-irían

Imperative
	-ar verbs	-er verbs	-ir verbs
Singular	-a	-e	
Plural	-ai	-í	

Present Subjunctive: Singular
	-ar verbs	-er verbs	-ir verbs
First Person	-e	-a	
Second Person	-es	-as	
Third Person	-e	-a	

Present Subjunctive: Plural
	-ar verbs	-er verbs	-ir verbs
First Person	-emos	-amos	
Second Person	-ís	-ais	
Third Person	-en	-an	

Imperfect Subjunctive: Singular
	-ar verbs	-er verbs	-ir verbs
First Person	-ara	-iera	
Second Person	-aras	-ieras	
Third Person	-ara	-iera	

Imperfect Subjunctive: Plural
	-ar verbs	-er verbs	-ir verbs
First Person	-aramos	-ieramos	
Second Person	-árais	-ierais	
Third Person	-aran	-ieran	

Future Subjunctive: Singular
	-ar verbs	-er verbs	-ir verbs
First Person	-are	-iere	
Second Person	-ares	-ieres	
Third Person	-are	-iere	

Future Subjunctive: Plural
	-ar verbs	-er verbs	-ir verbs
First Person	-aremos	-ieremos	
Second Person	-areis	-iereis	-ieris
Third Person	-aren	-ieren	

== Modern use ==
Haketia, unlike other varieties of Judaeo-Spanish, did not develop a literary tradition, so the language remained as a colloquial form of communication and was not used as a vehicle for formal education, since in Spanish Morocco, Spanish was used, along with French at the Alliance Israélite Universelle schools. Due to the influence of spoken Spanish in northern Morocco, Haketia has been further influenced by modern Spanish, which has contributed greatly to its diminution.

Nevertheless, there has been a slow renaissance of the language, helped by musicians such as Vanessa Paloma Elbaz with a variety of performances and the recordings of her sound archive KHOYA as well as others such as Doris Benmaman, Mor Karbasi, Kol Oud Tof Trio, and Lala Tamar, among others. José Benoliel and Alegría Bendayán de Bendelac have both compiled Spanish-Haketía dictionaries, published in 1977 and 1995, respectively. The Caracas Center of Sephardic Studies regularly publishes articles in Haketia in its magazine Maguen-Escudo. The language is also spoken in some communities in the Amazon areas of Brazil.

== Scholarship ==
Joseph Benoliel collected oral tradition, grammar, and a lexicon. Alegria Bendelac conducted fieldwork. Nina Pinto-Abecasis collected folklore. Vanessa Paloma Elbaz collected many songs from the oral tradition and published extensively on the community and its music in the early twenty-first century.

== Status ==
Decline began as early as 1860 during the Spanish occupation of Tetuan and accelerated as an increasing share of Haketia speakers adopted Modern Spanish. Today Haketia is a declining language with only 1,000 speakers remaining, down from 30,000 in 1900.

== Bibliography ==
- Cunha, Alvaro (2009). Introdução à fonologia da hakitía (Masters thesis).
- Cunha, Alvaro (2012). Narrativa na (língua judaico-marroquina) hakitía
