= Twelfth Zionist Congress =

World Zionist Congress

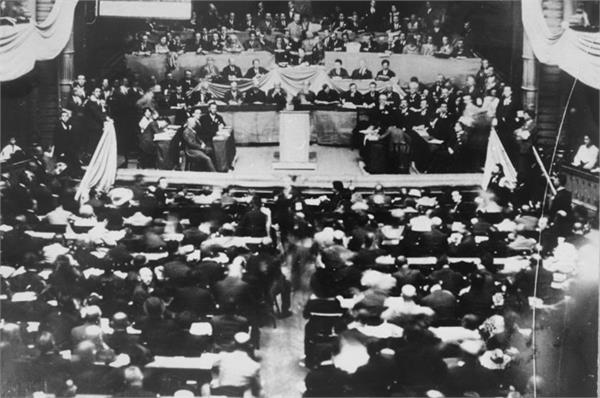
- Genre: Zionist Congress
- Date: September 1–14, 1921
- Location: Karlovy Vary (Carlsbad)
- Country: Czechoslovakia
- Previous event: 11th (1913)
- Next event: 13th (1923)
- Organiser: Zionist Organization

Breakdown of delegates to the 12th Zionist Congress. 73.4% General Zionists, 18.6% Mizrahi & 8% Poale Zion

The Twelfth Zionist Congress was held in Carlsbad (Karlovy Vary), Czechoslovakia, from September 1 to 14, 1921. It was attended by 445 elected delegates, representing 770,000 fee paying members, as well as many ex officio participants. There were no delegates from post-Revolution Russia. At the time of the previous Congress in 1913 the World Zionist Organisation had 217,231 members.

In an opening speech to the Congress the British ambassador in Prague repeated the terms of the Balfour Declaration. All subsequent Congress’s, until 1937, were addressed by a British diplomat.

Chaim Weizmann was endorsed as president of the World Zionist Organization (WZO). Weizmann wrote that the Congress was able "to bring the movement down to earth, to some appreciation of the hard facts, and to set our feet on the only path that could lead to success - the path of slow, laborious and methodical work in Palestine."

== Background ==
As a consequence of World War I, much had changed since the previous Congress, held in Vienna in 1913. In 1917 Chaim Weizmann had succeeded in getting a degree of official British support for the Zionist project in the form of the Balfour Declaration. Ottoman Palestine had been conquered and occupied by the British. In Russia the Tsarist Empire had been overthrown and replaced by the Bolsheviks. There had been mass pogroms of Ukrainian Jews. With the defeat of Germany, the centre of Zionist activity had moved from Berlin to London.

During the war Ze'ev Jabotinsky succeeded in establishing the Jewish Legion, a separate Battalion within the British Army.

Partly due to the expulsion of many of the non-Ottoman citizens at the beginning of the war, the 1914 Jewish population in Palestine of around 90,000 had fallen to about 55,000. Immigration had resumed with 10,000 Jews arriving in the first years of the British rule. More than 90% of the population were Arabs.

The initial British Military Administration, under General Allenby, had refused to make any special arrangements for the Zionists, believing that it was against International Law for a Military Occupation to make changes to the Status Quo. Following the establishment of a civilian administration under Herbert Samuel senior Military Officers had objected to the establishment of government funded Zionist schools.

The 1918 arrival of the Zionist Commission's in Palestine had mixed results. Two years later the Chief Administrator in Palestine, General Bols sent a report to General Headquarters in Cairo recommending that the Commission be abolished. He stated that "from the commencement [they had] adopted a hostile, critical, and abusive attitude" and that "It is manifestly impossible to please partisans who officially claim nothing more than a "National Home", but in reality will be satisfied with nothing less than a "Jewish State" and all that it politically implies".

In Palestine there was growing opposition to Zionism amongst the local Arab population. Groups such as the Muslim-Christian Associations and the Palestinian Arab Congress had been established.

In May 1921 there had been serious anti-Zionist rioting in Jaffa and other parts of the country. In response High Commissioner Samuel had halted all Jewish immigration. He had also upset the Zionist leadership by recognising Bedouin rights to the land around Beisan.

A Zionist conference was held in London in July, 1920, at which Weizmann was elected president of the Zionist Organization, and Sokolow was elected as chairman of the newly created Palestine Zionist Executive, to be based in London and Jerusalem. The conference also established the Zionist fundraising organisation, Keren Hayesod. During the conference there was opposition to Weizmann's leadership from the American followers of Louis Brandeis.

A month before the congress Samuel urged that steps were taken to convince the Arabs "that the success of Zionism will be to their benefit and not result in their destruction" and that the Congress should make a declaration to that effect.

== Participants ==
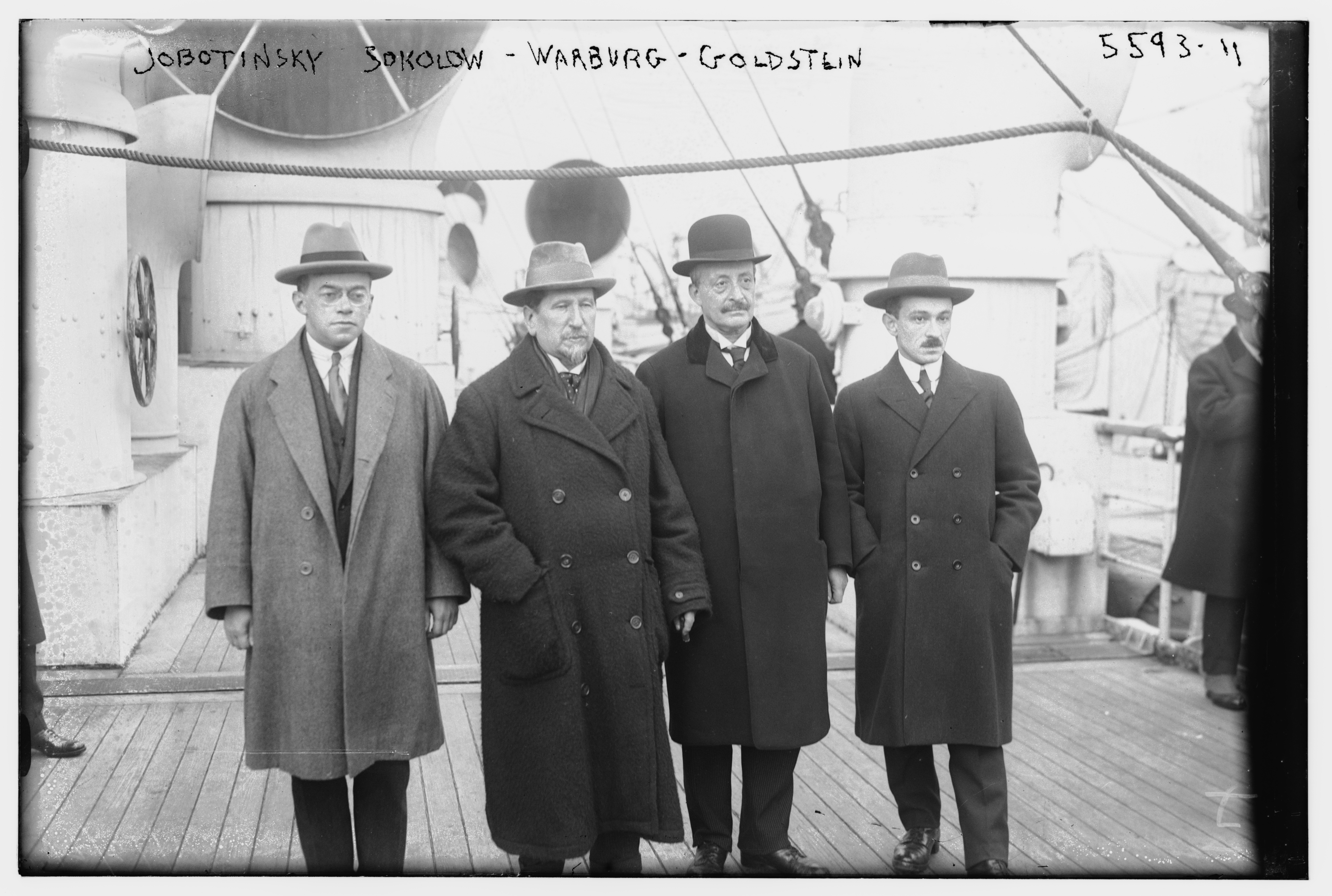
Zionist leaders (L to R) Ze'ev Jabotinsky, Nahum Sokolow, Otto Warburg, and Alexander Goldstein, c. 1922

Membership of the Zionist Organization was open to any Jew, over 18 years old, who purchased one "shekel" (membership token). Members were then allowed to elect delegates to the Zionist Congress. Groups, such as Poale Zion and the Mizrahi, were allowed to bulk buy shekels, and resell them, taking a commission, to their members. In November 1920 Ben Gurion ordered 678,000 shekels from the London office, for his newly formed party, Achdut ha-Avodah, in preparation for the 12th Congress. In the end only 11,000 were sold.

At the London Zionist conference in July 1920 it had been announced that the number of registered Zionist was around one million. At the 12th Congress it was stated that there were 855,590 registered members. At the previous Congress in 1913 there had been 217,231 members.

The 512 delegates at the 12th Congress consisted of 376 General Zionists (73.4%), 95 Mizrahi (18.6%) and 41 Poale Zion (8%). The Mizrahi delegates were pressing for more deference to the Torah.

Amongst the delegates was the poet Hayim Nahman Bialik who gave a speech defending Jewish workers in Palestine who were being criticised by those calling for more efficiency.

Ze'ev Jabotinsky: In a speech to the Congress Jabotinsky argued that Arab opposition could be ignored "..because America did not obtain the consent of the Red Indians when it settled the whites there, nor did Australia seek consent of the blacks." His followers advocated a stronger line towards the British. He was elected to the Executive Council of the Zionist Organization.

Berl Katznelson, a labour leader from the Yishuv, argued for autonomy between Jews and Arabs in Palestine. He claimed that Samuel was too afraid of Arab reaction and that a Military Administrator would have had a more robust reaction to the riots. He told the Congress that "During the forty years of the New Yishuv, Jews have yet to attack an Arab village and there has yet to occur a case where a Jew attacked an Arab." But that there was great "distance between us and the Arabs" and that "We must guarantee the security of our own lives; only then will there be a basis for negotiations. We cannot concede our aspiration to become a majority in the country." He continued it was "obvious to everyone that our most crucial political activity must be: to renew our immigration; to strengthen our pioneering spirit; to reinforce our hagana and to fortify our position in the country."

A proposal by Arthur Ruppin to buy large tracts of land in the Jezreel Valley was opposed by the directorate of the JNF led by Nehemia de Lieme.

Nahum Sokolow called on Arabs to seek agreement with the incoming Jews rather than seeking a reversal of the Balfour Declaration. Whilst President of the Zionist Organization, 1918-19, he is quoted as saying "The Jewish State was never part of the Zionist Program."

Yosef Sprinzak was the first representative of Zionist workers in Palestine to be elected to the Executive.

Menachem Ussishkin argued that only through increased immigration and strength would the Arabs recognise the new reality. "We cannot treat with the Arabs by the sword or provocatively.... We must just keep quiet and betake ourselves to Palestine. We shall have many bad moments. But if we keep going to Palestine, in tens, in hundreds, in thousands, in hundreds of thousands, the Arab question will solve itself."

Chaim Weizmann declared that Zionists would negotiate with the Arabs but only on the basis of the Balfour Declaration. In speeches to the Congress Weizmann stated: "We Zionists had neither the force of arms, nor gold, nor influence.... We had the moral strength of our idea, our historic right, our unshakable fidelity to Zion and a testimonial in the work we had already accomplished for the revivification of Palestine.... With these weapons, and these only, we entered the battle for our recognition as a nation."
Later he said "Not English generals or imperialist can be the foundation of our policy, but English intellectuals. Balfour had acknowledged [the principle of] the Balfour Declaration long before the War; the War simply had the effect of accelerating it."

Answering an interpellation he stated "The Mandate has now been published, and cannot henceforward be altered, except in one respect. Transjordan, which in the first text of the Mandate was outside the sphere of the Mandate, is now included in the Mandate. By this means, Herr Van Lieme, the question concerning the eastern frontier has been in part answered. The question will be still better answered when Cisjordania is so full of Jews that a way is forced into Transjordania."

== Political Report ==
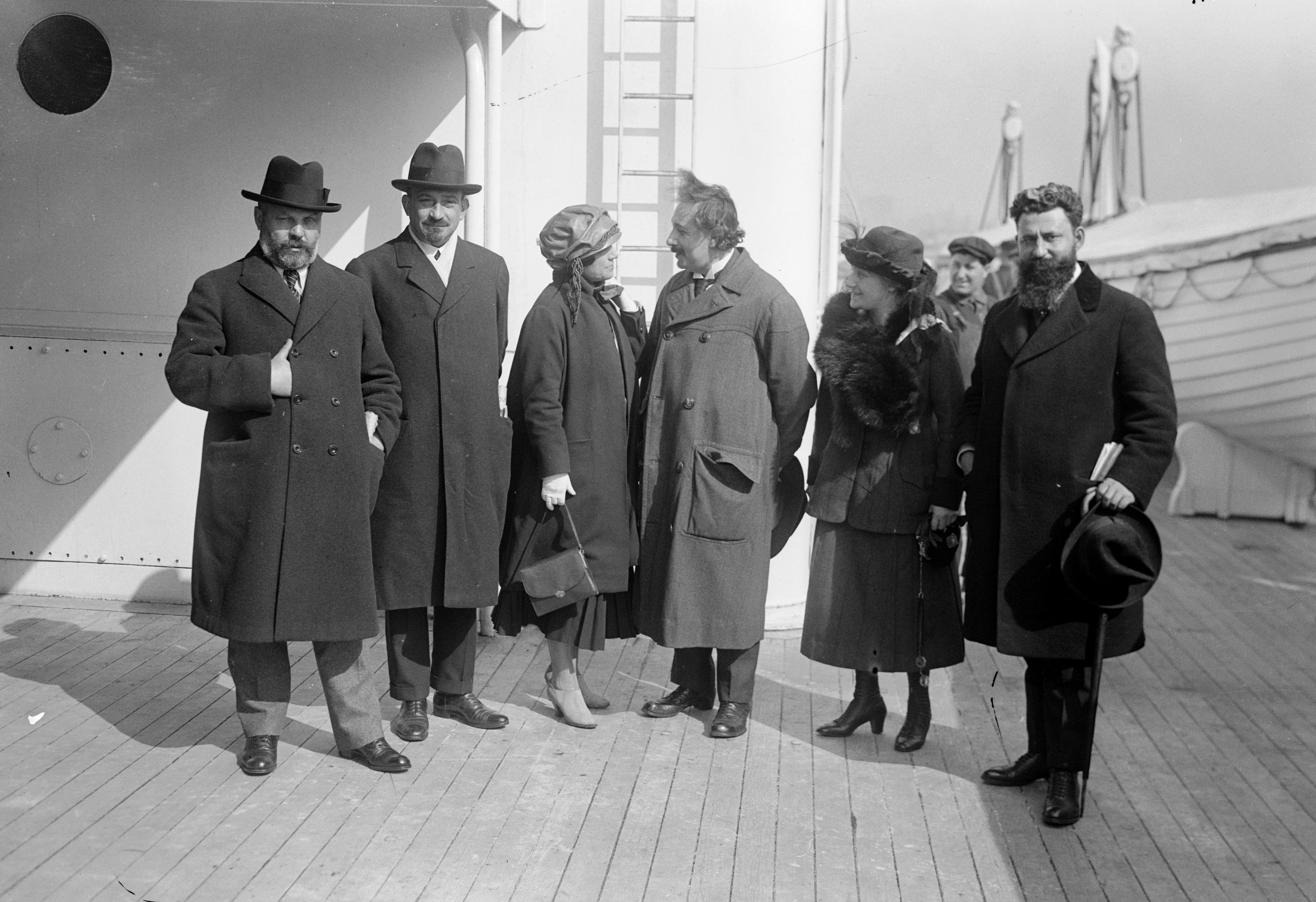
Albert Einstein and his wife Elsa (center) arriving in New York, April 1921. They are greeted by a delegation of Zionist leaders, including Chaim Weizmann (2nd from left), several months prior to the 12th Zionist Congress

The pre-prepared Political Report stated "General Allenby's proclamation, published in Jerusalem towards the end of 1917, contained no reference to the Jewish National Home," "... indeed during the whole of 1918 and 1919 the Declaration was never officially published, never even officially referred or alluded to, in any public function [in Palestine]." The Report went on "The military authorities evidently thought that any official mention of the fact [the issue of the Balfour Declaration] might mar the jubilation of certain sections of the population". Hence the Zionist Commission "did not, at first, object to such official attitude.... They were fully aware of the exigencies of the military situation; they also realised that victory was the first and paramount need of the moment; they agreed that friction in the country might handicap the operations, and that a full display of the Government's pro-Zionist attitude had better be postponed till after the victory. It must be admitted to-day, even by the severest critic, that the Comission was fully justified, under the circumstances, in deciding upon this line of conduct.... Moreover, it seemed at that moment (under the influence of the War which taught us to worship facts and despise documents) that the presence of a Zionist Commission was of far greater importance than a reprint of a mere letter to Lord Rothschild."

The Report quotes Weizmann as saying that Palestine should "become just as Jewish as America is American and England is English." He also said: by a Jewish National Home we mean "the creation in Palestine such conditions as should enable us to establish between 50,000 and 60,000 Jews per annum there, and to settle them on the land."

Commenting on some British military officers complaining about Zionist activity the Report says "Major-General Money (Chief Administrator June 1918 to June 1919), in a public speech at the inauguration of the Rothschild Hospital [Jerusalem], condemned the policy of creating "separate institutions for different communities," whether charitable or educational. Shortly afterwards a circular letter was sent from Headquarters to all Military Governors asking their opinion as to the advisability of creating mixed Government schools, for Arabs and Jews together. The Zionist Commission, it goes without saying, energetically resisted all these attempts, and it is possible that its endeavours, as well as representations made by the London Office to the Home Government, had something to do with Major-General Money's recall from the post of Chief Administrator."

The report also cautioned "In quarters in which Zionist aspirations were regarded with unqualified sympathy ... the view was almost unanimously taken that it was neither possible on general grounds, nor desirable in the interests of the Zionist movement itself, to provide in the Mandate for the conferment upon the Zionist Organization of anything savouring of an economic monopoly. There could be no doubt that Zionist co-operation in the economic development of the country would, in practice, be welcomed, and that Zionists would have every opportunity of participating in it to the full extent of their resources. On the other hand, the concession in terms of far-reaching privileges, while in itself adding little of practical value, would excite opposition which there was no advantage in gratuitously challenging, and might even be plausibly represented as inconsistent with the Covenant of the League of Nations"

The Political Report formalised that the Zionist Commission should take over the Jaffa based Palestine Office, established in 1908.

== Action Committee ==
The Action Committee, meeting in Prague before the Congress, proposed a budget of $17,500,000 for 1922. It was to be used for buying land in Palestine and the absorption of immigrants. Weismann pointed out that "no such sum was in sight." Jewish fundraisers in the United States, such as Judah Magnes, were focused on raising large sums of money for Jewish communities in Central and Eastern Europe suffering from post-war famines and pogroms. At the Congress the budget was reduced by 20-30%. It was decided to set up new settlements at Nahalal, Kfar Yechezkeil, Ain Harod, and Tel Yosef. Weizmann described this as the "beginning the conquest of the land."

The ambitious budget had included purchasing 62,000 dunams in the Jezreel Valley for £282,000 and increasing the capital of the Anglo-Palestine Bank to £1,000,000. The budget was based on unrealistic estimates of Keren Hayesod’s income, predicted to be £25,000,000 in a year. In reality Keren Hayesod raised £600,000 in the 18 months to September 1922.

The Congress agreed to maintain all Jewish schools in Palestine that accepted WZO authority and that all institutions supported by WZO must observe Jewish religious laws. There was a call for the increase of the use of Hebrew as a spoken language.

== Resolutions ==
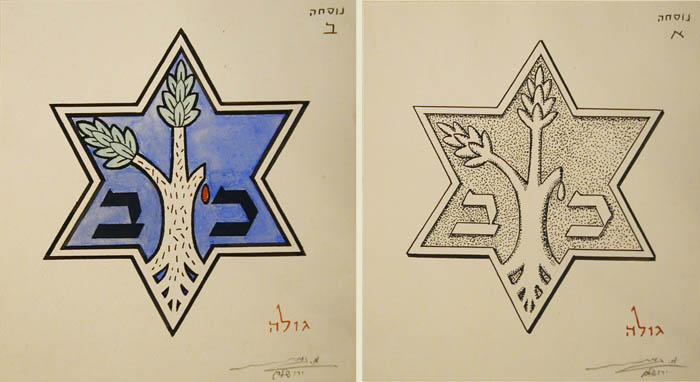
Two versions of the 12th Zionist Congress emblem, by Meir Gur Aryeh

At the San Remo conference the Zionist Organization had been successful in getting the full text of the Balfour Declaration included in the draft of the British Mandate over Palestine. They had also succeeded in introducing an additional paragraph which recognised the "historical connection of the Jewish people with Palestine" and that this constituted the "grounds for reconstituting their national home in that country." France and Italy had endorsed the text of the Balfour Declaration previously, with some rewording by the Italians. The United States had not yet endorsed the declaration and was not a member of the League of Nations which had yet to agreed to the Mandate. The Mandate text laid down conditions for working with the Zionists and the forming of a Jewish Agency. Article 4 stated that the government would recognise a "Jewish agency ... as a public body for the purpose of advising and co-operating with the Administration of Palestine in such economic, social and other matters as may affect the establishment of the Jewish national home and the interests of the Jewish population in Palestine...". It added the condition that "so long as its organisation and constitution are in the opinion of the Mandatory appropriate." Anticipating this the Congress issued regulations for regional federations within the Zionist Organization, defining their rights, duties and powers, as well as the procedures for the election of officials. A "Court of Honour" was established to consider ideological issues.

The number of members required to be eligible to elect one delegate to Congress was raised from 200 to 2,500. The number of members needed to form a separate union, such as Poale Zion and the Mizrahi, was increased from 3,000 to 20,000.

As well as electing Weizmann as president of the Zionist Organization, Sokolow was elected as chairman of the newly created Palestine Zionist Executive which was to be based in London and Jerusalem.

Despite opposition from those who believed that "Jewish Land" should not be rented to individuals, the Congress agreed to allow the establishment of privately run farms, moshavim, as well cooperatives, moshav, on land owned by Zionist agencies.

With reference to the May riots the fourth resolution declared "before the entire world that the free immigration to Erez Israel is an incontestable right of the Jewish people, of which in no circumstances it may be deprived." And that "The Congress expresses its firm conviction that only a just policy of equal rights and equal duties for all sections of the population of Erez Israel, only a strict and inexorable enforcement of justice and the protection of life and property, only an honest and consistent policy based upon the Balfour Declaration, can give peace to the country."

Addressing the situation in Palestine the Congress passed the fifth Resolution. "The Arab People: With sorrow and indignation the Jewish people have lived through the recent events in Palestine. The hostile attitude of the Arab population, incited by unscrupulous elements to commit deeds of violence, can neither weaken our resolve for the establishment of the Jewish National Home nor our determination to live with the Arab people on terms of concord and mutual respect, and together with them to make the common home into a flourishing Commonwealth, the upbuilding of which may assure to each of its peoples an undisturbed national development. The two great Semitic peoples united of yore by the bonds of common creative civilisation will not fail in the hour of their national regeneration to comprehend the need of combining their vital interests in a common endeavour. The Congress calls upon the Executive to redouble its efforts to secure an honourable entente with the Arab people on the basis of this Declaration and in strict accordance with the Balfour Declaration. The Congress emphatically declares that the progress of Jewish colonisation will not affect the rights and needs of the working Arab nation."

The concluding statement called for reaching an agreement with the Arabs [as] "a spirit of peace motivates [the Jewish people], and ... it is [their] desire to live together with the Arab people in fraternal peace on the land," with the " revival and uplifting" of Palestine for "our good, for yours, and for the good of the whole country."

== Bibliography ==
- Encyclopaedia Britannica. Vol. 23 (14th ed.). 1929.
- Encyclopaedia Judaica. Vol. 16. Keter Publishing House. 1971.
- Barbour, Nevill (1946). Nisi Dominus: A Survey of the Palestine Controversy. George G. Harrap & Co. Ltd.
- Cohen, Israel (1951). A Short History of Zionism. Fredrick Muller Ltd, London.
- Jiryis, Sabri (2025). The Foundations of Zionism. Ebb Books. ISBN 9781738468744.
- Kedourie, Elie; Haim, Sylvia G., eds. (1982). Zionism and Arabism in Palestine and Israel : The Yishuv, Sir Herbert Samuel, and the Arab Question in Palestine, 1921-1925 Neil Caplan. Frank Cass. ISBN 0-7146-3169-8.
- Litvinoff, Barnet (1976). Weizmann. Last of the Patriarchs. Hodder and Stoughton. ISBN 0-340-20020-0.
- Storrs, Ronald (1939). Orientations. Readers Union.
- Teveth, Shabtai (1987). Ben-Gurion. The Burning Ground. 1886-1948. Houghton Mifflin. ISBN 0-395-35409-9.
- Wavell, Archibald (1943). Allenby in Egypt. George G. Harrap & Co. Ltd.
- Weizmann, Chaim (1949). Trial and Error: The Autobiography of Chaim Weizmann. Hamish Hamilton.
