= Nina Pinto-Abecasis =

Israeli folklorist (1971–2019)

- נינה פינטו אבקסיס
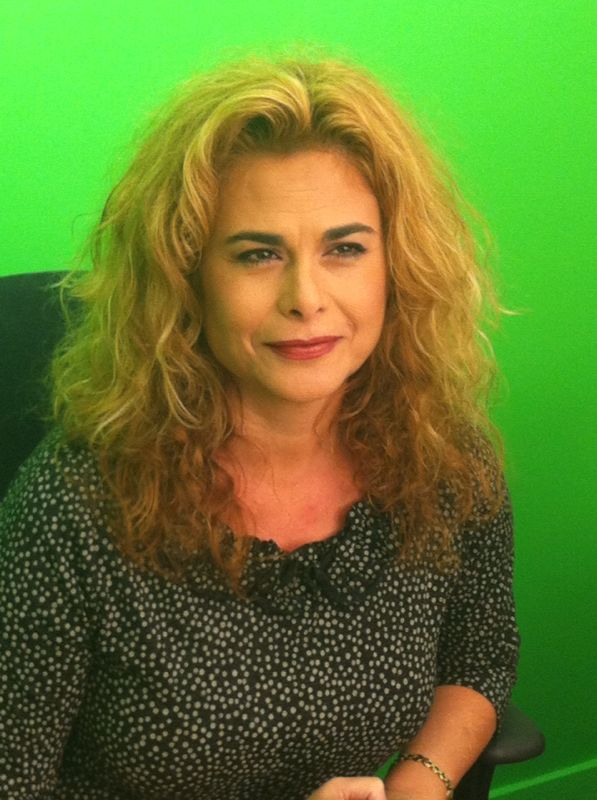
- Born: 1971; Ashkelon, Israel
- Died: 22 July 2019 (aged 48); Tel Aviv, Israel
- Education: Hebrew University of Jerusalem; Yad Ben Zvi
- Employer(s): Haaretz; Kol Yisrael; Ashkelon Academic College; Bar-Ilan University
- Children: 2
- Awards: Prime Minister's Prize for Hebrew Literary Works

Nina Pinto-Abecasis (Hebrew: נינה פינטו אבקסיס, 1971 – 22 July 2019) was an Israeli folklorist, writer and educator. Her folklore research specialised in the Haketia (also written as Hakitia or Haquitía) language, a form of Judaeo-Spanish historically spoken by Sephardim in North Africa. She was also known for advocating for the inclusion of nicknames in folklore studies.

== Biography ==
Pinto-Abecasis was born in 1971 in Ashkelon, Israel. Her parents had emigrated to Israel from Tétouan, Morocco, during the 1960s. She wrote a book about her childhood growing up in the Shimshon neighbourhood and her family heritage.

After completing her military service, Pinto-Abecasis studied a bachelor's degree and master's degree in Hebrew literature at the Hebrew University of Jerusalem.

After graduating from university, she had a media career. She covered police and crime affairs for the Haaretz newspaper and wrote and presented a radio programme on Kol Yisrael from 1995 to 1996.

From 2001 to 2008, Pinto-Abecasis was a lecturer at Ashkelon Academic College. She then completed a PhD at Yad Ben Zvi research institute. From 2012, she was a research fellow at Bar-Ilan University in Ramat Gan.

Pinto-Abecasis' folklore research specialised in the Haketia (also written as Hakitia or Haquitía) language, a form of Judaeo-Spanish historically spoken by Sephardim in North Africa. She was also known for advocating for the inclusion of nicknames in folklore studies, publishing Towards the inclusion of nicknames in the genres of folklore: The case of the former Jewish community of Tetuan, Morocco in 2014, covering her findings about humour and gender in Hebrew-based nickname practices. From 2015, she served as a consultant on the board of the National Authority for the Culture of Ladino.

Pinto-Abecasis won the 2018 Prime Minister's Prize for Hebrew Literary Works (also known as the Levi Eshkol Literary Award).

Pinto-Abecasis died from gastrointestinal cancer on 22 July 2019 in Tel Aviv, Israel, aged 48. She wrote a book about her battle with cancer, which was published around the time of her death.
