= Alegría Bendayán de Bendelac =

Venezuelan writer (1928–2020)

- Born: 1928; Caracas, Venezuela
- Died: 2020
- Occupation(s): philologist, professor, writer and Jewish poet

Alegría Bendayán de Bendelac (April 19, 1928 – April 5, 2020) was a Venezuelan philologist, professor, writer and Jewish poet. During her career she was dedicated to studying Sephardic culture, especially the Judeo-Spanish language of northern Morocco. She was professor of French at the University of Pennsylvania and published several works about sephardic traditions.

== Biography ==
Alegría Bendayán de Bendelac is the fourth of five siblings, daughter of Moroccan immigrants from Tétouan who arrived at Villa de Cura, Aragua state. Her parents were Abraham Bendayan and Rachel Cohen de Bendayan. Soon their parents settled in Caracas. She married Rafael Bendelac on June 24, 1953. The couple had two daughters, Mercedes and Lisa.

In 1963 she emigrated to New York, where she worked as a French teacher in various schools. Subsequently, she graduated with a degree in French from Columbia University and then obtained a PhD in French Literature at the same university. After graduating, she began teaching at Fordham University and later joined Penn State University. Among her works are dictionaries and historical investigations of Sephardic language and traditions, she was also dedicated to writing poetry.

She died of natural causes at the age of 91 in Kew Gardens, NY.

== Works ==
- Diccionario del Judeoespañol de Los Sefardíes del Norte de Marruecos (1995)
- Voces Jaquetiescas (1990)
- Los Nuestros. Sejiná, Letuarios, Jaquetía y Fraja. Un retrato de los sefardíes del Norte de Marruecos a través de sus recuerdos y su lengua (1860-1984) (1987)
- Structures du rêve et de la realité dans Sylvie (1975)
- Typical Sephardic weddings in Tangier, Morocco (c.1930-c.1950) (1986)
- Tourmaline II (1973)
- Mosaique: Une enfance juive a Tanger (1930-1945) (1992)
