= Isaac Ben Walid =

Moroccan rabbi (1777–1870)

- יצחק בן וואליד إسحاق ابن الوليد
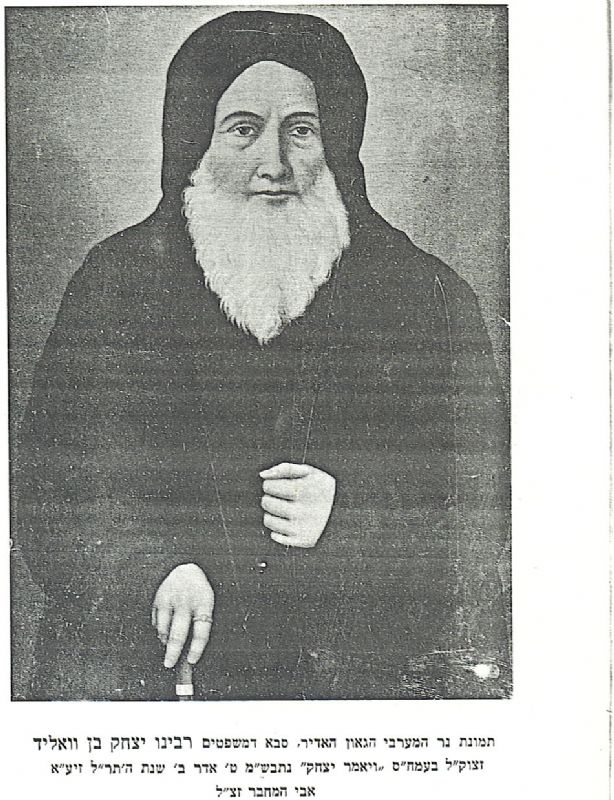

Isaac Ben Walid (Hebrew: יצחק בן וואליד, Arabic: إسحاق ابن الوليد; 1777–1870), also known by his epithet The Fair, was a Moroccan rabbi. He served as the rabbi of Tétouan for approximately 40 years. Ben Walid also authored a two-volume book on the history of Jews in Tétouan, entitled So Spoke Isaac (ויאמר יצחק). In 1860, he founded the first ever school of the Alliance Israélite Universelle, located in Tétouan.

== Biography ==
Isaac Ben Walid was born in Tétouan in 1777 to Rabbi Shem Tov and into a family of rabbis. He was named after his grandfather, Rabbi Isaac. Ben Walid's father died when he was young, and his family became poor.

Ben Walid married a woman from a family of rabbis. She gave birth to his eldest son before dying shortly thereafter. He later married Simcha, a daughter of Rabbi Widal Pipas (וידאל ביבאס), who gave birth to 10 children who became rabbis.

Ben Walid spent most of his life teaching students the Torah. His mausoleum is located in Hay Al-Quds, formerly Tétouan's Jewish quarter, and it hosts a memorial celebration, or hillula, annually.

== See also ==
- Hiloula of Rabbi Isaac Ben Walid
