= Chaim Nahum =

Ottoman rabbi (1872–1960)

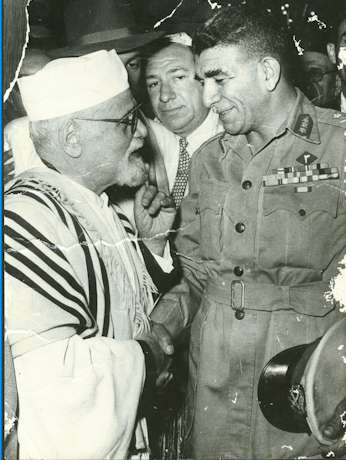
Chaim Nahum with President Muhammad Naguib in 1953

Chaim (Haim) Nahum Effendi (Turkish: Haim Nahum Efendi; Hebrew: חיים נחום; Arabic: حاييم ناحوم) (1872–1960) was a Turkish Jewish scholar, jurist, and linguist of the early 20th century.

He served as the Grand Rabbi of the Ottoman Empire.

== History ==
He was born in 1872 in Manisa, Turkey. He was sent by his parents to a yeshiva in Tiberias, after which he studied at a French lycée for his secondary education and obtained a degree in Islamic law Istanbul. Thereafter, he attended a rabbinical academy in Paris, from which he received his semicha. At the same time, he studied linguistics, history, and philosophy at the Sorbonne's School of Oriental Languages.

Upon his return to Istanbul, Nahum occupied various teaching positions, including at the Turkish military academy. While there, he became acquainted with many of the leaders of the Young Turk movement, who gained power in 1908.

In 1909 Nahum succeeded Moses Levi as Hakham Bashi, or chief rabbi, of the Ottoman Empire. "Nahum invested much effort in the restoration of communal institutions. He found a fervent advocate in the person of David Fresko, the editor of El Tiempo," a Ladino newspaper who politically supported the positions of Turkish reformers. During World War I he strove to be appointed as the Ambassador of the Ottoman Empire to the United States but did not get the position.

During the peace negotiations following Turkish War of Independence that followed World War I, Nahum, the representative of the Ottoman Jews, was a member of the Turkish delegation that signed the Lausanne Treaty. For his services to the Turkish government he was given the title of effendi.

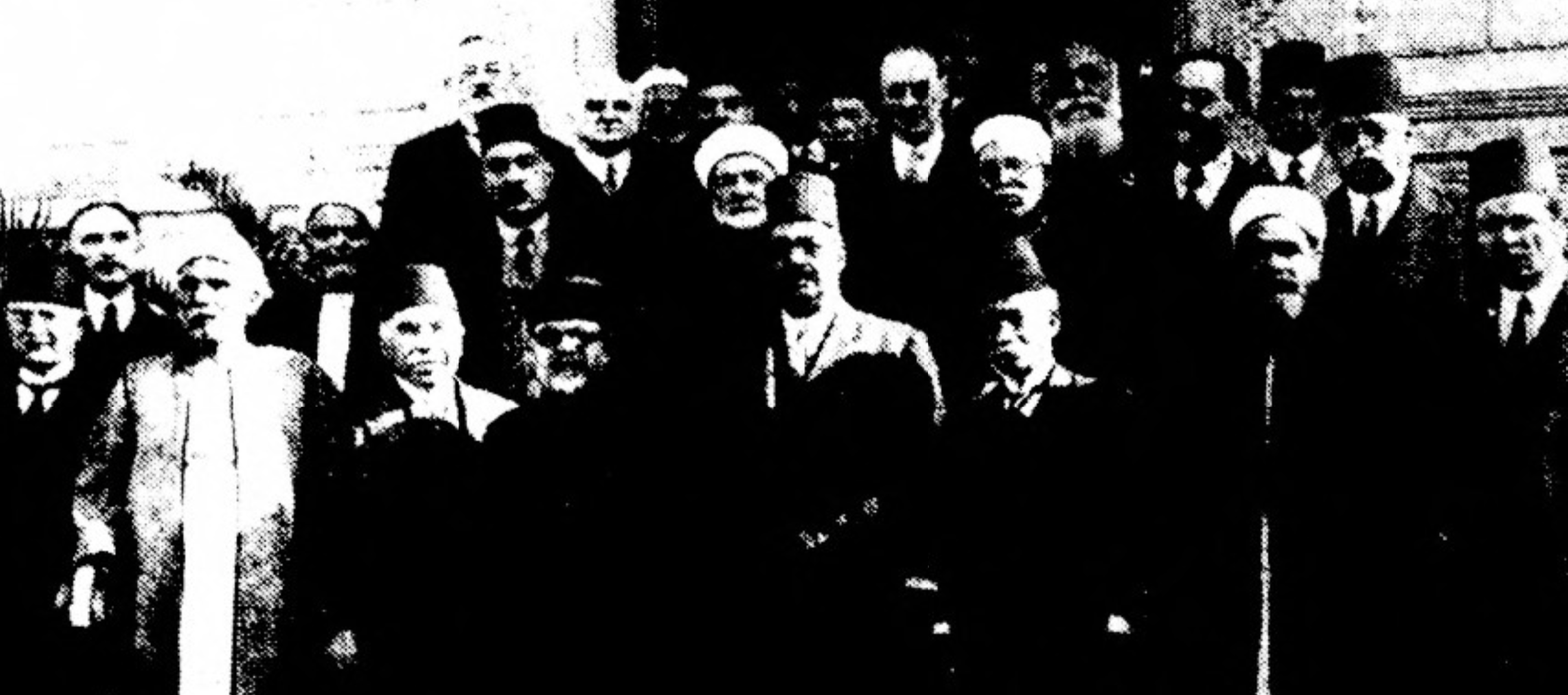
Nahum among other members of the Royal Academy of the Arabic Language at its inauguration January 30, 1934. From the front page of Al-Ahram.

In 1923 he received an invitation from Moise Cattaoui Pasha, head of the Jewish community of Cairo, to become chief rabbi of Egypt. He was appointed a Senator of Egypt's Legislative Assembly and was a founding member of the Royal Academy of the Arabic Language. Among his many scholarly works was a translation into French of all Ottoman firmans, or edicts, sent to the governors and rulers of Egypt by the Sublime Porte from the Turkish conquest of Egypt in 1517 until the late 19th century.

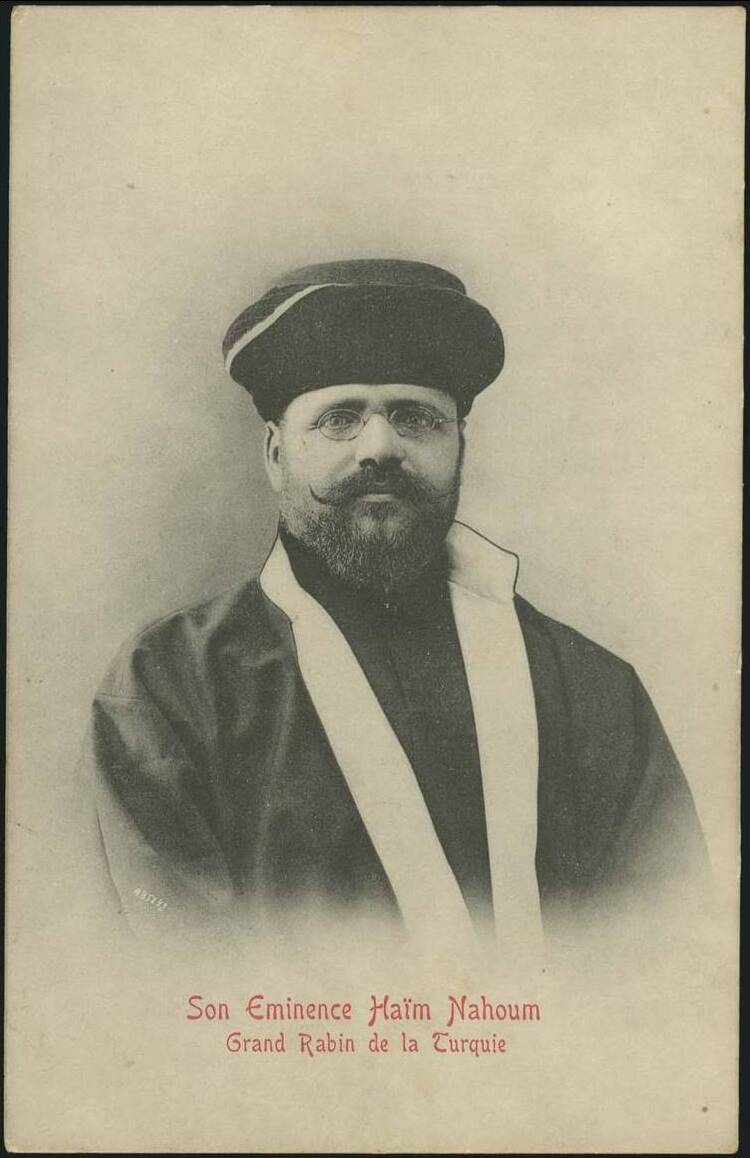
As Chief Rabbi of the Ottoman Empire. Ottoman Postcard.

His works on the history of the Egyptian community are of particular importance. In 1944 he helped to reconstitute the Société d'études historiques juives d'Égypte (Society for the Historical Study of the Jews of Egypt) and served as its honorary head. Rabbi Nahum was also active in international affairs, assisting in the establishment of contacts between Jews throughout the world. He visited Ethiopia and arranged for several Ethiopian Jews to study in Egypt. Until the German occupation of Rhodes, he was a great supporter of the Sephardic yeshiva on the island and sent many young men to study there.

The creation of Israel in the late 1940s led to increased economic and political hardship for Egypt's Jewish community. Hundreds were arrested and interned for "Zionist activity". Jewish businesses were confiscated, Jewish bank accounts frozen, and exit visas could be approved only by a special government agency for Jewish affairs. Nahum attempted to ameliorate the effect of these developments for his community with mixed success.

"Nahum was a supporter of Ottomanization and thus opposed Zionism, though he was willing to assist some of their goals: allowing Jewish emigration to and settlement in Palestine and purchase by land there by non-citizens".

Around 1950, at age 78, Nahum became totally blind, but continued to carry on his duties as best he could. He continued to officiate at the Shaar Ha Shamayim synagogue, and could give long quotations from the Hebrew Bible and rabbinical texts from memory. However, he became greatly depressed by what he realized was the inevitable decline of Egyptian Jewry. Suffering from increasingly severe medical ailments, he finally succumbed in 1960 at the age of 88. He was buried at the Bassatin cemetery outside Cairo. Nahum's funeral was attended by thousands, including many Muslims and Christians.

In the decades that followed, much of the cemetery was vandalized and desecrated. Rabbi Nahum's tomb is now inhabited by squatters.

== Publications ==
- La vie Juive en Babylonie entre les 3eme et 8eme siecles (1900)
- Sept mois en Abyssinie, etude historique sur les Falachas (1909)
- La Littérature Karaite en Turquie (1912)
- Traduction Francaise Commentee de 1064 firmans imperiaux ottomans concernant L'Egypte de 1517 (1932)

Jewish titles
Preceded by Moses Levi	Chief Rabbi of the Ottoman Empire; 1909–1920	Succeeded by Shabbetai Levi
Preceded by Masoud Haim Ben Shimon	Chief Rabbi of Egypt; 1925–1960	Succeeded by Haim Moussa Douek
