= Academy of the Arabic Language in Cairo =

Regulatory institution for the Arabic language

مجمع اللغة العربية بالقاهرة Academy of the Arabic Language in Cairo
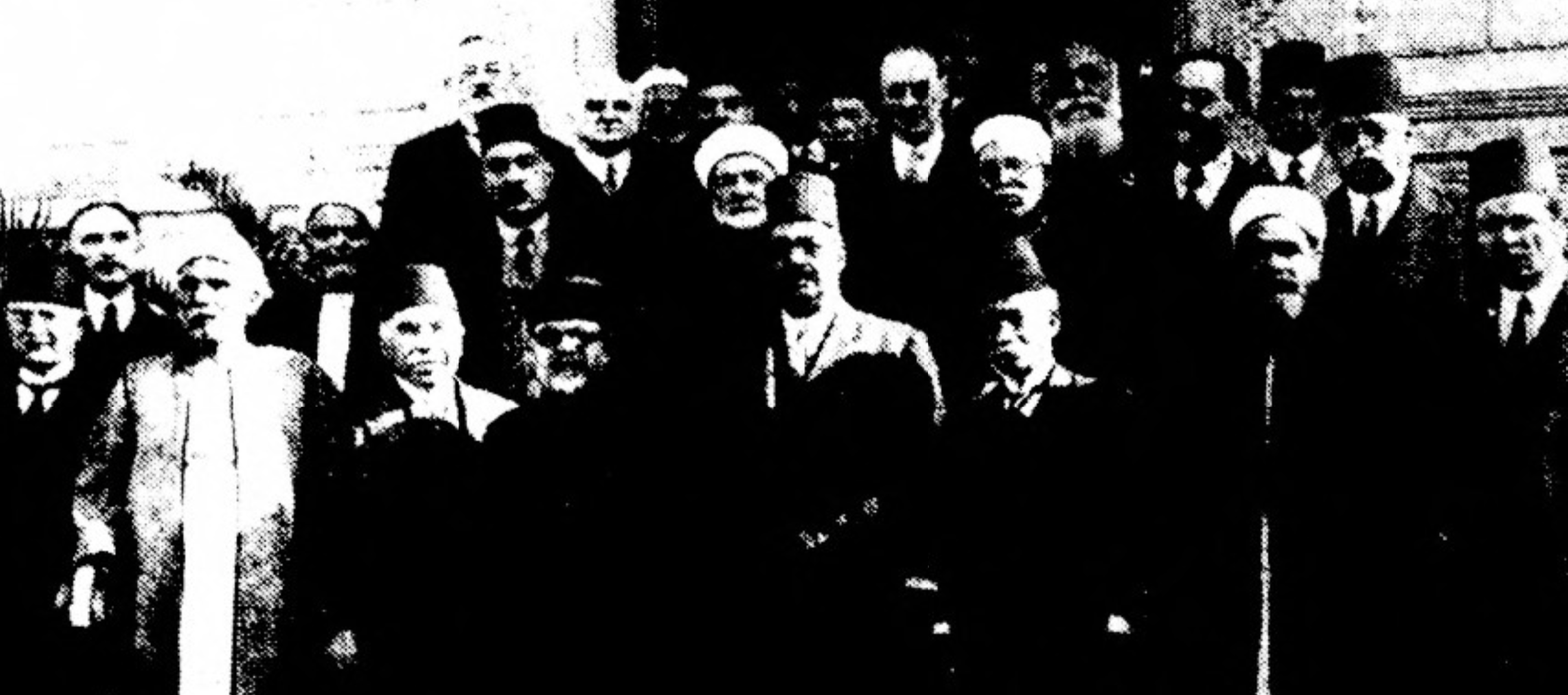
- The academy the day of its inauguration in 1934
- Formation: December 31, 1932 (14 Sha'ban of 1351 of the Hijra)
- Headquarters: Giza
- Coordinates: 30.0620°N 31.2241°E
- Website: https://www.arabicacademy.gov.eg

The Academy of the Arabic Language in Cairo (Arabic: مجمع اللغة العربية بالقاهرة, romanized: Majmaʻ al-Lughah al-ʻArabīyah) is a language academy for Arabic created in Cairo, Egypt in 1932 by Fuad I of Egypt. It publishes Al-Mu'jam al-Kabir (The Great Dictionary) and Al-Mu'jam al-Wasīt (The Intermediary Dictionary), two of the most important dictionaries of the Arabic language.

== Name ==
It was founded as the Royal Academy for the Arabic Language (مجمع اللغة العربية الملكي majma' al-lughah al'arabiyyah al-malaki) in 1932. In 1938, it became the Fu'ad I Academy for the Language. After the 1952 free officers movement and the end of the monarchy, it became the Academy of the Arabic Language.

== Background ==
The academy's first permanent secretary, Mansur Fahmi, chronicled in an article entitled [History of the Academy] (تاريخ المجمع), published in the first issue of the academy's journal (مجلة مجمع اللغة العربية في القاهرة) in 1934, the attempts of Arab men of letters to establish a regulatory institution for the Arabic language—none of which was successful.

The Academy of the Arabic Language in Cairo was born out of ideas and movements of late 19th century Egypt, including: Pan-Islamism, Pan-Arabism, and the Nahda. It was modeled after language academies in the Arab world and abroad, most notably the Institut d'Égypte.

=== Schools ===
In 1826, Muhammad Ali sent a scholarly mission from Egypt to France, including Rifa'a at-Tahtawi, who later proposed the establishment of Madrasat al-Alsun in 1836. Dar al-Ulum, established in 1872, educated Azhari scholars in modern sciences. The works of translation produced by institutions like these introduced some of the earliest modern problems for the Arabic language.

=== Presses ===
Muhammad Ali established the Amiri Press or Bulaq Press, the first printing press in Egypt, in 1821. It was followed by others, such as al-Matba'a al-Ahliya al-Qabtiya (المطبعة الأهلية القبطية) in 1860, Wadi an-Nil (مطبعة وادي النيل) in 1866, Gam'iyat al-Ma'arif (جمعية المعارف) in 1868, al-Ahram (الأهرام) in 1875, Sharikat Tab' al-Kutub al-'Arabiya (شركة طبع الكتب العربية) 1898.

== History ==
Establishing a language academy was proposed in Egyptian Parliament in the parliamentary year 1928-1929.

On December 31, 1932 (14 Sha'ban of 1351 of the Hijra), the Academy of the Arabic Language in Cairo was established by royal decree issued from the Abdeen Palace, residence of Fuad I of Egypt. Also involved were President of the Council of Ministers Ismail Sidky, Minister of Education Muhammad Hilmi Isa, and likely also the previous minister of education Ahmed Lutfi el-Sayed and Mansur Fahmi. Its constitution was inspired by the constitution of the Académie Française.

The Academy of the Arabic Language in Cairo was established for the purposes of addressing urgent issues facing the Arabic language and of adapting it to suit the needs of the 20th century. One of the early tasks of the Academy of the Arabic Language in Cairo was to publish a historical dictionary of Arabic, tracing the changes of meanings and uses of Arabic words over time, though this was not achieved.

=== Selecting the founding members ===
King Fuad I of Egypt—who wanted an institute in the image of his regime, in its regard toward modern science and its domestic and foreign interests—played a major role in the selection of the academy's members. The ulama, scholars, and intellectuals he chose were modernists and politically loyalists, moderates, or neutral. These included:

Political figures

- Muhammad Tawfiq Rif'at Pasha
- Chaim Nahum
- Fares Nimr

Academics

- Mansur Fahmi
- Ali al-Gārim
- Ahmad al-'Awāmiri

Azharis

- Ahmad al-Iskandari
- Hussein Wali
- Muḥammad al-Khiḍr Ḥusayn
- Ibrahim Hamrush

Eastern members

- Muhammad Kurd Ali
- Abdulqadir al-Maghrebi
- Isa Iskandar al-Ma'luf
- Anastase-Marie al-Karmali
- Hassan Husni Abd al-Wahhab

Orientalists

- H. A. R. Gibb
- Louis Massignon
- Carlo Alfonso Nallino
- August Fischer
- Enno Littmann

=== Headquarters ===
At its inception, the Academy of the Arabic Language in Cairo was housed in the palace of Hussayn Riad at 1 Ibn Arhab Street in Giza, in front of the Egyptian University (now Cairo University). It later moved to 110 El Qasr El Einy Street, a building that was then demolished to build a bank. It finally moved to a villa at 26 Murad St in Giza.

=== Inauguration ===
The Academy of the Arabic Language in Cairo was inaugurated by Muhammad Hilmi Isa Pasha on January 30, 1934 (14 Shawwal 1352 of the Hijra), with all of the academy's members in attendance with the exception of Hassan Husni Abd al-Wahhab.

=== Arabic script reform ===
In 1936, the academy, prompted by issues arising in the transliteration of names in European scripts into Arabic, discussed the possibility of reforming Arabic script. This discussion was further expanded in 1938 with regard to the technical difficulty of printing vowels in Arabic at the time. The discussions were published to engage a wider audience, and in 1945 a competition with a £E1,000 prize was announced calling for proposals. The discussions continued for a number of years but no plan for reform of Arabic script was endorsed. These discussions did, however, lead to the definition of پ pe and ڤ ve to represent p and v.

Muhammad Tawfiq Rafaat, Ahmed Lutfi el-Sayed, and Taha Hussein served as presidents.

Wafaa' Kamil was the first woman to become a member of the Academy of the Arabic Language in Cairo.
