= Al-Mu'jam al-Kabir =

Al-Mu'jam al-Kabir (المعجم الكبير) may refer to:

- Al-Mu'jam al-Kabir (Al-Tabarani)
- Al-Mu'jam al-Kabir (dictionary)
