= August Fischer =

German orientalist and philologist (1865–1949)

August Fischer (14 February 1865 in Halle an der Saale – 14 February 1949 in Leipzig) was a German orientalist.

From 1883 to 1889 he studied theology and Oriental philology at the universities of Berlin, Marburg and Halle, receiving his doctorate with a thesis on the source biographies of Ibn Ishaq, Biographien von Gewährsmännern des Ibn Ishaq. In 1890 he obtained his habilitation for Oriental philology at the University of Halle, and several years later became an associate professor in Berlin. From 1900 to 1930 he was a full professor of Oriental philology at the University of Leipzig, where in 1914/15 he served as dean to the faculty of philosophy. For several years he was secretary of the philological-history group at the Saxon Academy of Sciences of Leipzig (1926–32).

He was a member of the Academy of the Arabic Language in Cairo and he contributed his notes for the development of Al-Mu'jam al-Kabir, the academy's project for a historical dictionary of Arabic.

== Published works ==
With Rudolf Ernst Brünnow, he was author of the highly acclaimed Arabische Chrestomathie aus Prosaschriftstellern (6h edition, 1953), an Arab chrestomathy translated into English and published with the title Chrestomathy of classical Arabic prose literature (2008). He was also an editor of the periodicals Zeitschrift der Deutschen Morgenländischen Gesellschaft (Journal of the German Oriental Society) and Islamica (1925–35; a journal for the study of languages and cultures of Islamic peoples). Among his other numerous writings were Die indirekte Rede im Altfranzösischen (Indirect speech in Old French, 1900) and the necrology for orientalist Christoph Ludolf Ehrenfried Krehl (Nekrolog auf Ludolf Krehl, 1901).
