= Dictionary of Serbo-Croatian Literary and Vernacular Language =

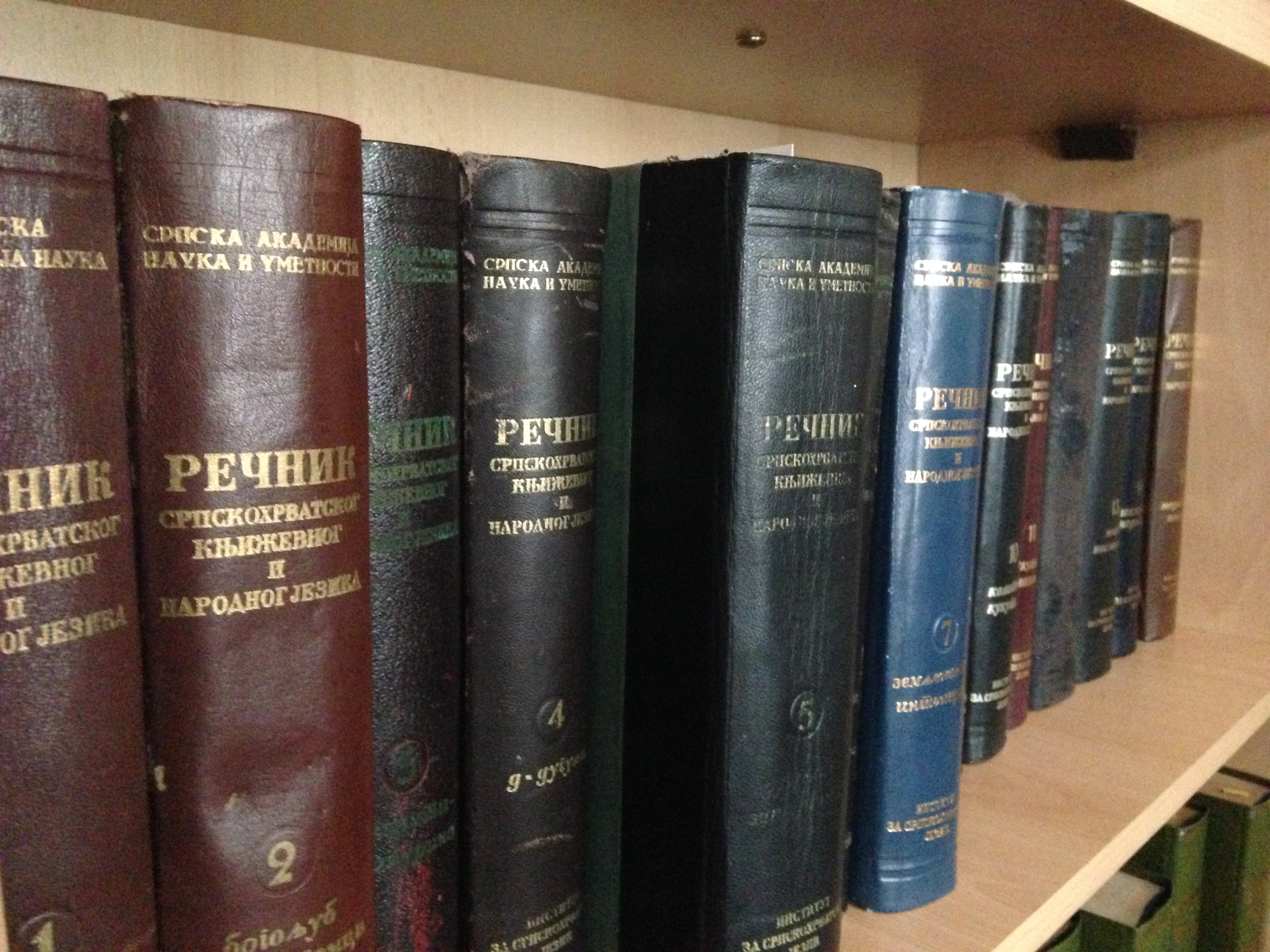
Close-up view of the book spines

The Dictionary of Serbo-Croatian Literary and Vernacular Language (Note: Serbo-Croatian: Речник српскохрватског књижевног и народног језика, Rečnik srpskohrvatskog književnog i narodnog jezika) or the Dictionary of the Serbian Academy of Sciences and Arts (Note: Serbo-Croatian: Речник Српске академије наука и уметност, Rečnik Srpske akdemije nauka i umetnosti (or Rečnik SANU for short)) is a dictionary of the Serbo-Croatian language published by the Serbian Academy of Sciences and Arts. The publication of the Dictionary has started in 1959, and is ongoing.

Twenty-two volumes have been published so far, having covered words up to the letter "p" (in order of the Cyrillic alphabet). In 2018, its authors estimated that about fifty more years are needed for the completion of the whole project. It is a historical dictionary whose entries are based on primary sources of actual usage in the last two centuries.

== History ==
The dictionary was initiated in 1888 by Stojan Novaković, a member of the Serbian Royal Academy, in the centenary commemoration of the birthday of Vuk Stefanović Karadžić. A sample volume was created by 1913, but further work on the dictionary was interrupted by the First World War, and later the Second World War, so conditions for steady work on it were realized after the founding of the Institute for the Serbian language in 1947. The publication of the Dictionary started in 1959, with a prominent Serbian linguist Aleksandar Belić as the editor-in-chief for the first volume, before he died in 1960. At the time, the official name of the language in Yugoslavia was "Serbo-Croatian". Since the break-up of Yugoslavia, the publication was continued by Serbia under the same name, despite the codification of its own "Serbian" language. It still contains and collects words from the whole area of Shtokavian dialects, i.e. words that now also belong to Croatian, Bosnian and Montenegrin standards. The publication of the Dictionary is mandated by the Serbia's Law on the Dictionary of the Serbian Academy of Sciences and Arts (2005).

== Contents ==
The first 21 volumes contain around 250,000 entries, while the complete dictionary is expected to have 40 volumes and around 500,000 entries. When completed, it will be one of the most comprehensive dictionaries in the world. By comparison, the Oxford English Dictionary has around 300,000, German Deutsches Wörterbuch has around 350,000, and Dutch Woordenboek der Nederlandsche Taal has about 430,000 entries.

Dictionary takes words from earlier published dictionaries, such as the Dictionary of Croatian or Serbian by the Yugoslav Academy of Sciences and Arts, A large dictionary of foreign words and expressions by Ivan Klajn, Turkisms in the Serbo-Croatian language by Abdulah Škaljić, and among other dialectological and terminological dictionaries, the terminology from General Encyclopedia of the Yugoslav Lexicographical Institute.

== Volumes ==
The dictionary is printed in Serbian Cyrillic script:

Volume	Published	No. of pages	First entry	Last entry
1	1959	694	A	Bogoljub
2	1962	800	Bogoljub	vražogrnci
3	1965	794	vraznuti	guščurina
4	1966	798	D	dugulja
5	1968	798	duguljan	zaključiti
6	1969	798	zaključnica	zemljen
7	1971	798	zemljenast	intoniranje
8	1973	800	intonirati	jurve
9	1975	800	jurget	kolitva
10	1978	800	koliti	kukutica
11	1981	800	kukutka	makva
12	1984	800	makven	mozurica
13	1988	800	moire	naklapuša
14	1989	800	naklasati	nedotruo
15	1996	799	nedošuiav	nokavac
16	2001	781	nokaš	odvrzivaši
17	2006	800	odvrkao	Opovo
18	2010	800	opovrgavanje	ocariti
19	2014	800	ocat	petoglasnik
20	2018	800	petogodan	pogdegod
21	2020	800	pogdekada	pokupiti
22	2023	800	pokupić	poslužiteljstvo

== See also ==
- Srpski rječnik
- List of Croatian dictionaries
