= Al-Mu'jam al-Kabir (dictionary) =

Book by Academy of the Arabic Language in Cairo

- Original title: المُعْجَم الكبير

Al-Muʿjam al-Kabīr (Arabic: المُعجَم الكبير "The Great Dictionary" or "The Comprehensive Dictionary") is a dictionary of Arabic published by the Academy of the Arabic Language in Cairo.

== History ==
Al-Muʿjam al-Kabīr, a historical dictionary intended to be encyclopedic in nature, was one of the most important tasks of the Academy of the Arabic Language in Cairo from its inception, as laid out in the academy's foundational charter. It was one of the two dictionaries the academy planned to publish from its founding in 1932, the other being Al-Mu'jam al-Wasīt, intended to serve students.

The German orientalist August Fischer, a member of the academy, provided his materials for the academy to develop into Al-Muʿjam al-Kabīr. However, the academy was critical of Fischer's materials as they were limited to the pre-Islamic period and the first 300 years of the Islamic period, seeing his work as supplementary to a comprehensive dictionary. The academy sought go beyond Fischer's interest in the semantic development of individual words to focus on a more comprehensive analysis and description of Arabic vocabulary.

Taha Hussein was made responsible for the completion of the project. He appointed professor of Semitic languages at Cairo University Dr. Murād Kāmil and the head of the Cultural Heritage of the Ministry of Education Ibrāhīm al-Ibyārī.

=== 1956 publication ===
The project suffered from a lack of funding, but Volume I, Part 1, covering hamza to " ʾ ḫ y ", was published in 1956. In 428 two-column pages, it covers a lexical range to which Edward William Lane devoted about 100 columns in his Arabic–English Lexicon and to which Hans Wehr devoted about sixteen in his Dictionary of Modern Written Arabic.

The Preface, تقديم (taqdim), describes the project the methods used. As von Grunebaum summarizes:

The difficulties facing the authors derive from the fact that of all living languages Arabic has had the longest productive life; the history of its development and spread has however been only imperfectly explored. In any event, Arabic poetry is known to have been composed during at least fifteen centuries, Arabic belletristic prose during some thirteen; besides, Arabic has served for an equally long period as a vehicle of scientific and philosophical thought. The language was transplanted from the desert to various urban milieus and has in its unusually varied history acquired a unique complexity and richness of vocabulary. That Arabic retained its identity throughout the vicissitudes of history is due above all to the fact that it is the language of the Koran.

It was printed at the Amiri Press in Bulaq.
