= First cabinet of Sirri Pasha =

Egyptian government between November 1940 and February 1942

First Cabinet of Sirri Pasha
- Cabinet of Kingdom of Egypt

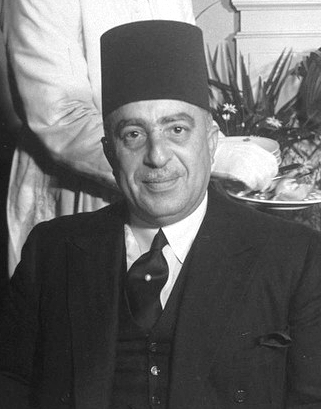
- Prime Minister Hussein Sirri Pasha
- Date formed: 18 November 1940
- Date dissolved: 4 February 1942

People and organisations
- Head of state: King Farouk
- Head of government: Hussein Sirri Pasha
- No. of ministers: 12
- Ministers removed: 8
- Total no. of members: 12
- Member party: Independent; Liberal Constitutional Party; Shaabist Party
- Opposition party: Saadist Institutional Party; Wafd Party

History
- Predecessor: Cabinet of Hassan Sabry Pasha
- Successor: Cabinet of Mostafa Al Nahas

The first cabinet formed by Hussein Sirri Pasha was one of the governments during the reign of King Farouk. The cabinet lasted from November 1940 to February 1942. It succeeded the cabinet of Hassan Sabry Pasha who suddenly died on 15 November while delivering a speech on behalf of the King at the opening session of the Chamber of Deputies.

== Cabinet members ==
Eight cabinet members, including Prime Minister Hussein Sirri Pasha, served in the previous cabinet led by Hassan Sabry Pasha. Two major political parties of the period, namely the Saadist Institutional Party and the Wafd Party did not take part in the cabinet. There were six independent politicians in the cabinet, and one of them was the Prime Minister. Five ministers were the members of the Liberal Constitutional Party, and one was a member of the Shaabist Party.

== List of ministers ==
The cabinet members were as follows:

| Portfolio | Minister | Took office | Left office | Party |
|---|---|---|---|---|
| Prime Minister | Hussein Sirri Pasha | 18 November 1940 | 4 February 1942 | Independent |
| Minister of Foreign Affairs | Hussein Sirri Pasha | 18 November 1940 | 26 June 1941 | Independent |
| Minister of Foreign Affairs | Salib Bey Sami | 26 June 1941 | 4 February 1942 | |
| Minister of Finance | Hasan Sadiq Pasha | 18 November 1940 | 5 December 1940 | |
| Minister of Finance | Abdel Hamid Badavi Pasha | 5 December 1940 | 4 February 1942 | |
| Minister of Interior | Hussein Sirri Pasha | 18 November 1940 | 4 February 1942 | Independent |
| Minister of Civil Defense | Younis Saleh Pasha | 18 November 1940 | 5 December 1940 | |
| Minister of Civil Defense | Hasan Sadiq Pasha | 5 December 1940 | 31 July 1941 | |
| Minister of Civil Defense | Abdel Kawi Ahmed | 31 July 1941 | 4 February 1942 | |
| Minister of Education | Hussein Heikal Pasha | 18 November 1940 | 4 February 1942 | Liberal Constitutional Party |
| Minister of Commerce and Industry | Salib Bey Sami | 18 November 1940 | 26 June 1941 | |
| Minister of Commerce and Industry | Rashwan Mahfouz Pasha | 26 June 1941 | 31 July 1941 | |
| Minister of Commerce and Industry | Abdul Rahman Omar | 31 July 1941 | 4 February 1942 | |
| Minister of Social Affairs | Abdel Galil Abu Samra | 18 November 1940 | 26 June 1941 | |
| Minister of Social Affairs | Ibrahim Dessuki Abaza Pasha | 26 June 1941 | 4 February 1942 | |
| Minister of Public Health | Ali Ibrahim Pasha | 18 November 1940 | 31 July 1941 | |
| Minister of Public Health | Hamid Mahmoud | 31 July 1941 | 4 February 1942 | |
| Minister of Justice | Hilmi Issa Pasha | 18 November 1940 | 31 July 1941 | |
| Minister of Justice | Mahmoud Ghalib Pasha | 31 July 1941 | 4 February 1942 | |
| Minister of Public Works | Abdel Kawi Ahmed | 18 November 1940 | 31 July 1941 | |
| Minister of Public Works | Ibrahim Abdel Hadi | 31 July 1941 | 4 February 1942 | |
| Minister of Agriculture | Ahmad Abdel Ghaffar Pasha | 18 November 1940 | 31 July 1941 | |
| Minister of Agriculture | Mohamed Raghep Attiya | 31 July 1941 | 4 February 1942 | |
| Minister of Communication | Saleh Bey Ibrahim | 18 November 1940 | 31 July 1941 | |
| Minister of Communication | Ahmad Khashaba Pasha | 31 July 1941 | 4 February 1942 | |
| Minister of Waqf | Mustafa Abdel Raziq Bey | 18 November 1940 | 4 February 1942 | Liberal Constitutional Party |
| Minister of Supplies | Mohamed Hamid Gouda | 31 July 1941 | 4 February 1942 | |

== Reshuffles ==
Throughout its term the cabinet saw three shuffles. On 5 June 1941 a crisis led to the resignation of the cabinet members, but it was solved following a minor reshuffle. The last reshuffle occurred on 31 July 1941 and was the most comprehensive one.

== Crisis and resignation ==
The cabinet was dissolved in early February 1942 when the British gave the King an ultimatum to strengthen the Anglo-Egyptian Treaty dated 1936. The British also demanded that diplomatic relations with Vichy France should be reduced. Upon these events King Farouk asked Prime Minister Hussein Sirri Pasha to fire the minister of foreign affairs, Salib Sami Pasha. Sirri Pasha did not accept this demand of the King and resigned from office on 1 February. It was replaced by the cabinet led by Mostafa Al Nahas on 5 February.
