= On Pre-Islamic Poetry =

1926 book by Taha Hussein

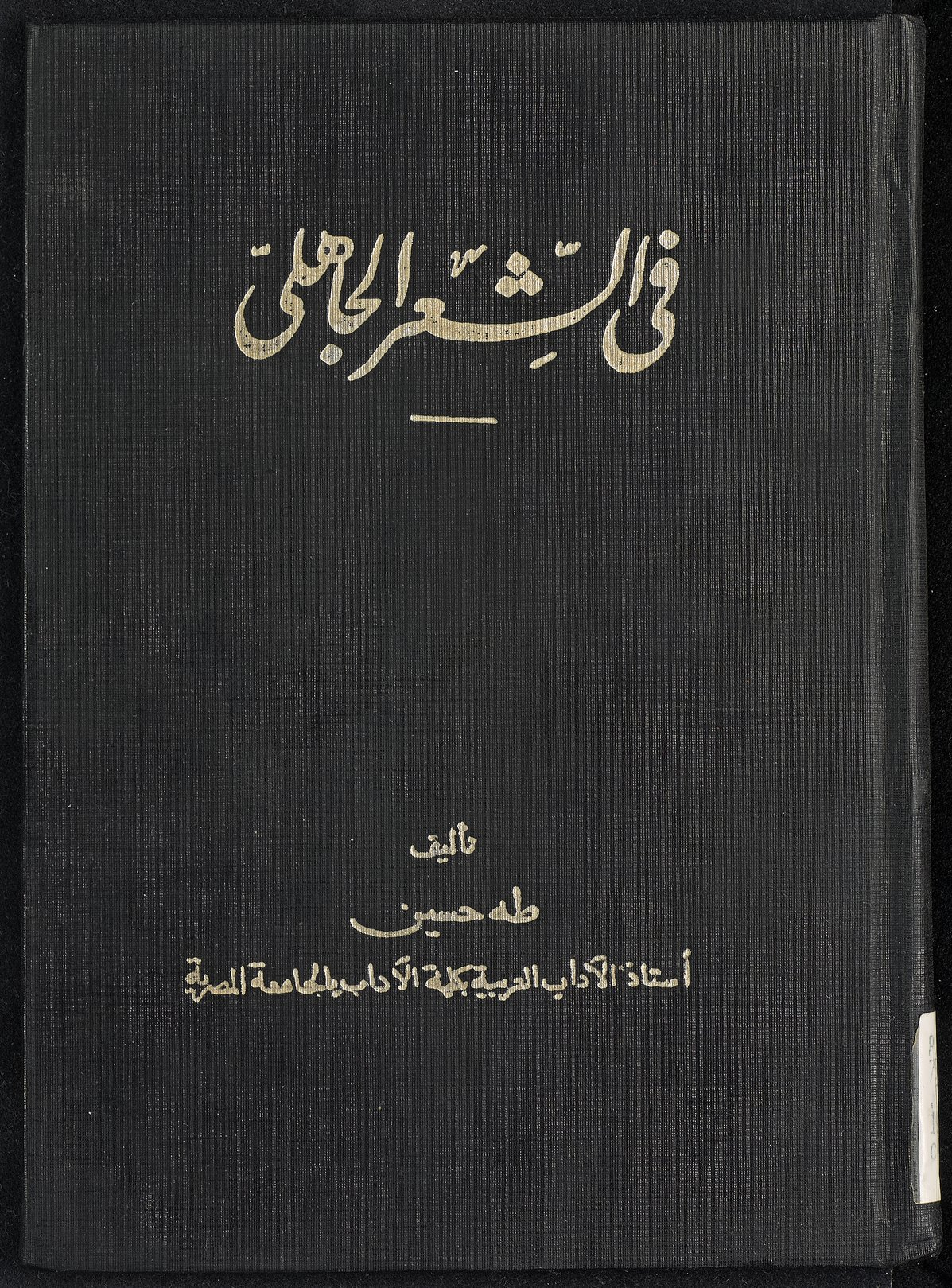
- Cover of the first edition, 1926
- Author: Taha Hussein
- Language: Arabic
- Genre: Literary criticism
- Published: 1926

On Pre-Islamic Poetry is a book of literary criticism published in 1926 by the Egyptian author Taha Hussein. In it, Hussein argued that pre-Islamic Arabic poetry, which then was believed to date from the pre-Islamic period, was actually from later eras. Hussein also cast doubt on the authenticity of the Quran. The book's publication caused a major literary controversy in Egypt.

In the English-speaking world, the Orientalist scholar D. S. Margoliouth published similar views at about the same time in his article "The Origins of Arabic Poetry."

== Contents ==
In the work, Hussein examines the canon of pre-Islamic poetry according to scientific principles. He concluded that some portions of the text of the Quran are inauthentic, and that the entire corpus of pre-Islamic poetry was a later forgery. As he put it,

the conclusion I reached was that the general mass of what we call pre-Islamic literature had nothing whatever to do with the pre-Islamic period, but was just simply fabricated after the coming of Islam. It is therefore Islamic, and represents the life, the inclination, the desires of Muslims, rather than the life of pre-Islamic Arabs.

Hussein believed, at the earliest, that pre-Islamic poetry was committed to writing after around two centuries of oral-transmission, in the mid-8th century. Political agendas, primarily to do with the Quraysh tribe, provided the impetus for the forgery. To support this argument, Hussein appealed to the fact that the dialectical variation that must have existed across the putative poets who wrote the poetry down is not to be found in the poetry itself, which reflects but a single Arabic dialect.

He criticized the story of Abraham and Ishmael specifically, arguing that the story of them building the Ka'bah was invented in order to serve the interests of the Quraish tribe.

== Reception ==
=== In Egypt ===
The publication of the book launched one of the two major controversies of Egyptian intellectual life in the 1920s. (Note: The other pertained to Ali Abdel Raziq's book Islam and the Foundations of Governance.) It had to be withdrawn and re-issued under the title On Pre-Islamic Literature in 1927, with the portions on the Quran removed. Because of the reaction to the work, Prime Minister Ismail Sidky removed Hussein from his position as dean of the literature department of the University of Cairo in 1932. Ahmed Lutfi el-Sayed, the head of the university, supported Hussein and refused to accept his resignation. Hussein regained his university post when the Wafd Party returned to power in 1936. At least five books were written in response to the work:

- Mostafa Saadeq Al-Rafe'ie – Under the Banner of the Quran
- Muhammad Loutfi Goumah – The Monitoring Comet
- Sheikh Al-Azhar Muhammad al-Khadr Hussein - Criticism of the Book On Pre-Islamic Poetry
- Muhammad Farid Wajdi – Criticism of the Book On Pre-Islamic Poetry
- Muhammad Ahmed al-Ghamrawi – Analytical Critique of a Book on Pre-Islamic Literature

=== In the West ===
The most immediate response to Hussein's work came from Erich Bräunlich in 1926. For example, Bräunlich pointed to the lack of interest in politics or any mention of Islam to dismantle Hussein's argument for the motive of the forgery of pre-Islamic poetry. He pointed to the larger and non-overlapping vocabulary it has with the Quran to rebut the argument that it was, somehow, developed from it. Due to these and other rebuttals by Bräunlich, the question of authenticity was largely considered settled amongst Western academics for the next few decades.

Developments in the understanding of oral tradition, specifically the theory of oral-formulaic composition propounded by Milman Parry and Albert Lord, have also superseded some of Hussein's work.

== Bibliography ==
- Allen, Roger (2005). The Arabic Literary Heritage: The Development of its Genres and Criticism. Cambridge University Press. ISBN 0-521-48525-8.
- Allen, Roger, ed. (2009). "Taha Hussein". Essays in Arabic Literary Biography: 1850-1950. Otto Harrassowitz Verlag. ISBN 978-3-447-06141-4.
- Bräunlich, Erich (1926). "Zur Frage der Echtheit der altarabischen Poesie". Orientalistische Literaturzeitung. 29 (1–6): 825–833. doi:10.1524/olzg.1926.29.16.417.
- Hanna, Suhail ibn Salim (1966). "Notes on the Historiography of the Pre-Islamic Odes" (PDF). Islamic Studies (Islamabad). 5 (3).
- Labib Rizk, Yunan (2001). "Taha Hussein's ordeal". Ahram Weekly. Archived from the original on 18 September 2018.
- Miller, Nathaniel (2024). The Emergence of Arabic Poetry: From Regional Identities to Islamic Canonization. University of Pennsylvania Press. ISBN 978-1-5128-2531-2.
