= Deutsches Fremdwörterbuch =

Dictionary of loanwords in German

The Deutsches Fremdwörterbuch (DFWB) is a multiple-volume dictionary of foreign words loaned into the German language, covering words which are in current use in German on historical principles.

== History ==
The DFWB originates from a proposal made by Friedrich Kluge, originally conceived as a complement to the Deutsches Wörterbuch of Jacob and Wilhelm Grimm. Since the publication of the first volume (A–K) by the project's founder Hans Schulz in 1913, the project has had a chequered history. Otto Basler, who took over the work after Schulz's death in 1923, was then only able to complete the second volume (L–P) and one fascicle from the letter Q before, due to his worsening blindness, turned over the extensive collections belonging to the project to the Institut für deutsche Sprache (IDS, Institute for the German Language) in Mannheim. There, under the leadership of Alan Kirkness, the rest of the letters R–Z were completed in volumes 3 to 6 and the work as a whole was finished in 1988 with the publication of a volume containing a detailed index. The first edition was thus published in 7 volumes between 1913 and 1988.

Since 1990 a group at the IDS has been engaged in a long-term project to create a new edition of the letters A–Q. Their goal is to describe the present-day foreign vocabulary of German in a dictionary which is both up-to-date and unified methodically, structurally, and in its documentary thoroughness. Since 1995 the second edition, expected to consist of twelve volumes, has been published; so far seven have been published covering the letters A–H.

== See also ==
- Lexicography
- Loanword
