= Mustafa 'Abd ar-Raziq =

Egyptian Islamic philosopher

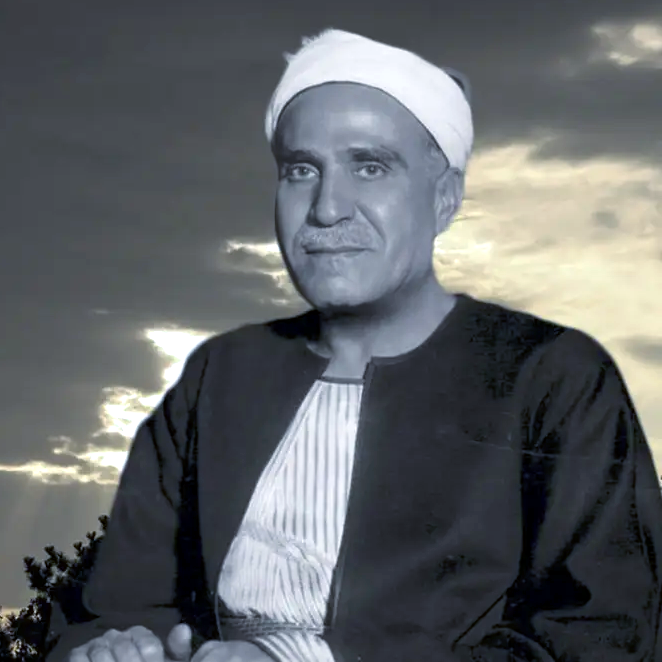
Mustafa Abdel Raziq

Shaykh Mustafa Abd ar-Raziq (Arabic: مصطفى عبد الرازق) (1885 – 15 February 1947) was an Egyptian Islamic philosopher.

== Early life ==
He was born in Abu Jirj, Minya Governorate.

== Career ==
Abd ar-Raziq succeeded Mustafa al-Maraghi as rector of al-Azhar. His appointment encountered resistance, since he was not a member of the Council of Supreme Ulama: King Farouk pressured for the law to be altered to allow him to assume office. Historian Fawaz Gerges characterized ar-Raziq as a "rebel member of al-Azhar" during his era.

A follower of Muhammad Abduh, Abd ar-Raziq wanted "to prove the compatibility of traditional Islamic philosophy with the rationalism of modern thought."

His brother, Ali Abdel Raziq, was an Egyptian scholar of Islam, religious judge and government minister.

He was involved with the Hizb al-Umma (1907–1925), an influential political party in early-20th century Egypt. He was among the contributors of al-Siyasa, newspaper of the Liberal Constitutional Party. In November 1940 Raziq was appointed minister of waqf to the cabinet led by Prime Minister Hussein Sirri Pasha.
