= The Future of Culture in Egypt =

Book by Taha Hussein

- Author: Taha Hussein
- Subject: Egyptian nationalism
- Publication date: 1938
- ISBN: 9775089204

The Future of Culture in Egypt (Arabic: مستقبل الثقافه في مصر) is a 1938 book by the Egyptian writer Taha Hussein.

The book is a work of Egyptian nationalism, advocating both the independence of Egypt and the adoption of various European modes of behaviour and institutions, such as a strong military. The book was written after the independence of Egypt by the British in 1922, but while there remained considerable British influence in the country.

Hussein stressed the shared heritage of the Mediterranean civilization, and Egypt's connections with European culture over its relationship with the Middle East and Arab culture. The book opposed the Arab nationalism and the call for unity among all Arabic-speaking nations. Hussein did not believe that Egyptians spoke Arabic, and asserted that Egyptian Arabic is actually its own distinct language.

"For Egyptians, Arabic is virtually a foreign language; nobody speaks it at home, school, in the streets, or in clubs. [...] People everywhere speak a language that is not Arabic, despite the partial resemblance to it."

The book advocated for the nationalisation of the Suez Canal as a move towards further independence of Egypt from the British Empire. This finally occurred in 1956 leading to the Suez Crisis.

He also talked of the need to improve Egyptian education.

"I see Egypt responding to my plea for ever greater efforts to banish ignorance from her midst and provide everyone—rich and poor, strong and weak, keen and dull, young and old—with his portion of knowledge. The delights of learning will permeate their soul and its light will illuminate every dwelling from castle to hovel. A new life and a new energy will infuse Egypt and will turn her into a veritable paradise on earth."
