= The Days (book) =

1926–27 book by Taha Hussein

- Author: Taha Hussein
- Language: Arabic
- Genre: Autobiography
- Published: 1926–67

The Days (Arabic: الأيام, romanized: Al-Ayyām) is a novelized autobiography in three volumes by the Egyptian professor Taha Hussein, published between 1926 and 1967. It deals with his childhood in a small village, then his studies in Egypt and France. It is one of the most popular works of modern Arabic literature.

== Volumes ==
The first volume was serialized in Al-Hilal, a literary magazine, from January 1926 to January 1927, then published as a book in 1929. It covers the author's childhood, with themes of the ignorance prevalent in rural Egypt and the customs practiced at that time and provides a detailed description of traditional Islamic education. It is written in a mixture of first- and third-person narrative. Hussein often interrupts himself, suggesting a lack of control. There are many references to the art of listening and descriptive details about the way things smell or feel, as Hussein subtly reveals that he has gone blind. It was published in English in 1932, titled An Egyptian Childhood and translated by E. H. Paxton.

Volume two was published as a book in 1940. It covers the time from his entrance into Al-Azhar to his entrance into Cairo University, focusing on his rebellion against his teachers and the traditions of Al-Azhar. Hilary Wayment translated it as The Stream of Days in 1948.

The third volume was serialized from March 1955 to June 1955 in the magazine Akher Saa, then published as a book in 1967. It is about the author's time at Cairo University, then his studies in France, where he obtained a doctorate degree, and finally his return to Egypt, where he became a professor. An English translation by Kenneth Cragg was published in 1973, under the title A Passage to France.

== Reception and influence ==
According to scholar Fedwa Malti-Douglas, "no other work of modern Arabic literature is so familiar to readers in both the Arab world and the West." The stylistic techniques employed by Hussein, especially the ironic dialogue between the narrator and the Hussein's childhood self, had a significant impact on the development of the Arabic novel.

== Bibliography ==
- Bamia, Aida A. (1999). "The Days". The Middle East Journal. 53 (4): 659. ISSN 0026-3141. Archived from the original on 2015-10-12 – via Questia.
- Allen, Roger (2005). The Arabic Literary Heritage: The Development of its Genres and Criticism. Cambridge University Press. ISBN 0-521-48525-8.
- Malti-Douglas, Fedwa (2014). Blindness and Autobiography: Al-Ayyam of Taha Husayn. Princeton University Press. ISBN 978-1-4008-5937-5.
