= Trésor de la langue française informatisé =

Online dictionary

- Website type: Digital dictionary
- Available in: French
- Creators: Computer Processing and Analysis of the French Language
- Website: atilf.atilf.fr
- Registration: None

The Trésor de la langue française informatisé or TLFi (French pronunciation: [tʁezɔʁ də la lɑ̃ɡ(ə) fʁɑ̃sɛːz(ə) ɛ̃fɔʁmatize]; "Digitized Treasury of the French Language") is a digital version of the Trésor de la langue française or TLF ("Treasury of the French Language"), a 16-volume dictionary of the French language of the 19th and 20th centuries, which was published between 1971 and 1994. It is freely available via a web interface. It was previously sold as a CD-ROM for Mac and Windows.

Since 2008, there are applications for macOS, iOS and Android.

The TLFi was created by the Analyse et traitement informatique de la langue française (ATILF; Computer Processing and Analysis of the French Language) joint research group, a collaboration between the French National Center for Scientific Research and the University of Lorraine. French linguist Alain Rey participated in its creation.

== History ==
The first upload of the TLFi took place in the early '90s at the National Institute of the French Language (INaLF) with the help of Alain Rey and Bernard Cerquiglini. The online version of the dictionary is presented without any modifications or updates. In 2001, the INaLF and Nancy 2 University collaborated to create the ATILF, a research lab associated with the French National Center for Scientific Research and the University of Lorraine.

The dictionary became available on CD-ROM on November 5, 2004, for Windows and Mac OS X.

== Description ==
The dictionary stems from the semantic analysis of the TLF and its analysis in several domains: definitions, usage examples, and semantic and lexical information.

Taking advantage of the rich database extracted from its analysis, the dictionary offers not only the capability to search by entry but also the possibility to do more complex searches. The hypertext interface allows for referencing across different versions of the dictionary.

== Contents ==
The TLFi contains definitions, examples from literary excerpts, technical field usages guides, information on semantics, history, etymology, grammar, usages, and synonyms and antonyms as well as hierarchical analyses linking these individual pieces of information. The dictionary is composed of many different elementary components (definitions, examples, technical usage guides, etc) that allow complex searches at multiple levels:

1. "Article by article" visualization, allowing for the search of particular information (definitions, phrases)
2. Assisted search allowing more specific searches (by etymology, usage domain, region, etc)
3. Complex searches, such as searching within a subdomain with only two characters

The content of the TLFi is that of the first edition of the TLF, and the ATILF indicates on its website that there are no plans to update it. The TLFi thus contains errors that were in the original TLF and errors that occurred during its digitalization.

The TLFi contains:

- 100,000 words and their history
- 270,000 definitions
- 430,000 examples
- 350,000,000 characters
