= Taha Hussein Museum =

Coordinates: 30.0049°N 31.1851°E

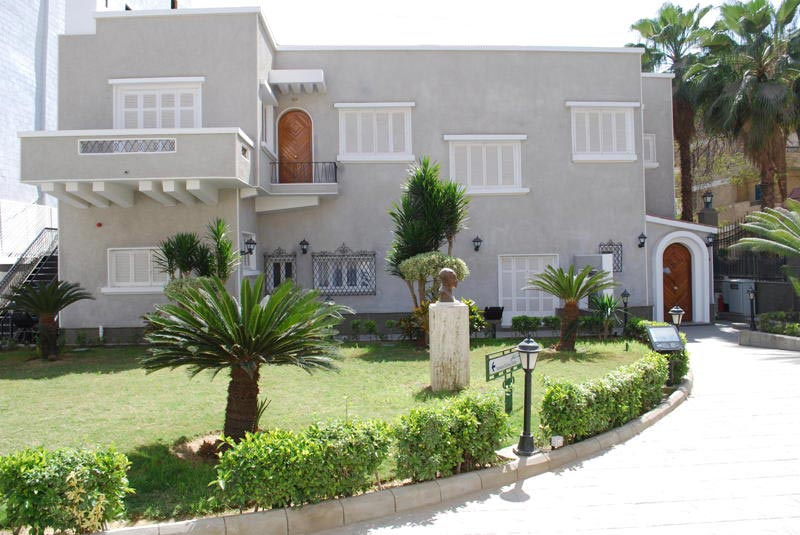
- Taha Hussein
- Established: 1991
- Location: Giza
- Type: Specialised museum

Taha Hussein Museum is a historic house museum and biographical museum in Giza, Egypt.

It is about the life, teaching, and residence of Taha Hussein, who was one of the most influential 20th-century Egyptian writers and intellectuals and a figurehead for the Al-Nahda—Arab Renaissance and the modernist movement in the Arab World.

The museum is located in Hussein's former home, where he lived from 1955 to 1973.

== Collection ==
The museum displays items related to Taha Hussein's life and work, including his study, library, furniture, personal belongings, medals, and decorations. The villa also includes rooms reflecting his family life and a library containing part of his book collection.
