= History of the Egyptian parliament =

Parliamentary life in Egypt has been a mark of Egyptian civilizations along its history. In modern Egypt, parliamentary life started as early as 1824 while representative parliamentary life did not start until 1866. In 2016, Egypt celebrated the 150th anniversary of Parliamentary life in their country.

As of 2019, Parliament of Egypt is bicameral, made up of the House of Representatives as the lower house and the Senate as the upper house.

== Early history ==
Egypt is known for beginning the earliest administrative and legislative codes in history. Throughout its history, formidable human cultures and civilizations offered the most advanced form of governance and management. The Egyptian Civilization laid the groundwork of governance and management. The Pharaoh, on top of the state hierarchy, appointed high-ranking government officials. A viable system of government has been in force ever since the third and fourth dynasties, several codes were unleashed; some were related to limited working hours of peasants while others combatted forced labor and other tiring jobs.

After Alexander the Great had invaded Egypt in 330 B.C., the Hellenistic era began, mixing between the Egyptian and the Greek civilizations. After his death, the Ptolemy era began only to be overthrown by the Romans.

Although Roman rule was bitter, Egyptians had retained most of their respective traditions, rules, and norms until Christianity spread in the first half of the first century, with the church largely sharing in the sustainability of intrinsic habits and customs.

== Middle ages ==
During the Islamic era, governance and legislation were principally drawn from the Qur'an and the Sunnah based on the formula of consultation sûra being one of the fundamental principles of Islamic law. When Cairo became the capital of the Fatimid Caliphate (969–1171) governance and legislation had developed. Furthermore, the city of Cairo became the capital of Egypt and the Islamic Caliphate.

Throughout the era of the Ayyubid dynasty (1171–1250), the Cairo Citadel became the headquarters and the center of power. Legislative and judicial councils diversified, and there was a justice council and another to attend to complaints lodged. Their duties involved laws as well as treaties with foreign countries

In the Mamelouk era (1250–1517), Sultan El-Zaher Baibars built the Court of Justice at Salah El-Deen El-Ayoubi citadel to be the government premises. Its competence covered enforcement of laws, settling of disputes, and negotiations with nearby countries.

== Pre-1923 history ==
In the era of (1517–1805), Islamic courts constituted the judicial system applied. Judges had their verdicts directly based on Islamic jurisprudence (Sharia) principles as far as civil and criminal disputes were concerned. This continued in effect until the end of the 18th Century. Thus, Egypt had been the scene of crucial political and social developments

In 1795, almost six years after the French Revolution, a major political uprising demanding rights, freedoms and justice fueled. It brought together national forces and popular leaderships in support of national demands for justice, equality and freedom.

As a result of the mounting resistance against the Ottoman ruler, the Wali and (Mamelukes), Egypt had been on the verge of a massive revolt. This led to the Ulama laying their hands on a written document which outlined the individual - ruler relationship averting a tax hike without the consent of the people's representatives notably, the dignitaries (the Ulama).

Emergence of political parties in Egypt in the 19th century was a reflection of social, economic and cultural interactions as well as certain historical, national and political circumstances, leading to the creation and development of modern institutions of government administration and society, such as the parliament, cabinets, political parties, syndicates, etc. This emergence has been gradual and has gone through successive stages. Political parties have firstly been formed as secret societies that were followed by formation of political groups.

The first ever of these was the National Party established in 1879 in the midst of the Urabi Revolution. However, it was short-lived and ended with the British occupation of Egypt in 1882 and the exile of the Urabists outside of Egypt. The next big landmark year was 1907, when a large number of parties were formed including: the Free National Party (al-Hizb al-Watani al-'urr), a pro-British party; the National Party (al-Hizb al-Watani), an anti-British party founded by Mustafa Kamil Pasha; the Nation Party (Hizb al-Umma), led by notable persons as Ahmed Lutfi el-Sayed and the Reformation Party (Hizb al-Isla'), formed by sheikh Ali Yusuf and ended with his death. In less than ten years, there was a great variety in these parties; in their nature, formation, organization, power, their popular base and platforms. There were national parties, groups dominated by the royal palace, others formed by the occupation authority as well as ideological parties expressing certain ideologies.

From 1907 to 1920, the already-formed political parties in Egypt were a starting signal for the dissemination of further parties; however, they were restricted due to the British occupation and Egyptian subordination to the Ottoman Empire. The February 1922 Unilateral Declaration of Egyptian Independence and the issuance of the 1923 Constitution led to the establishment a royal constitutional rule based on party pluralism and the principles of liberal democracy.

== Under the 1923 Constitution ==
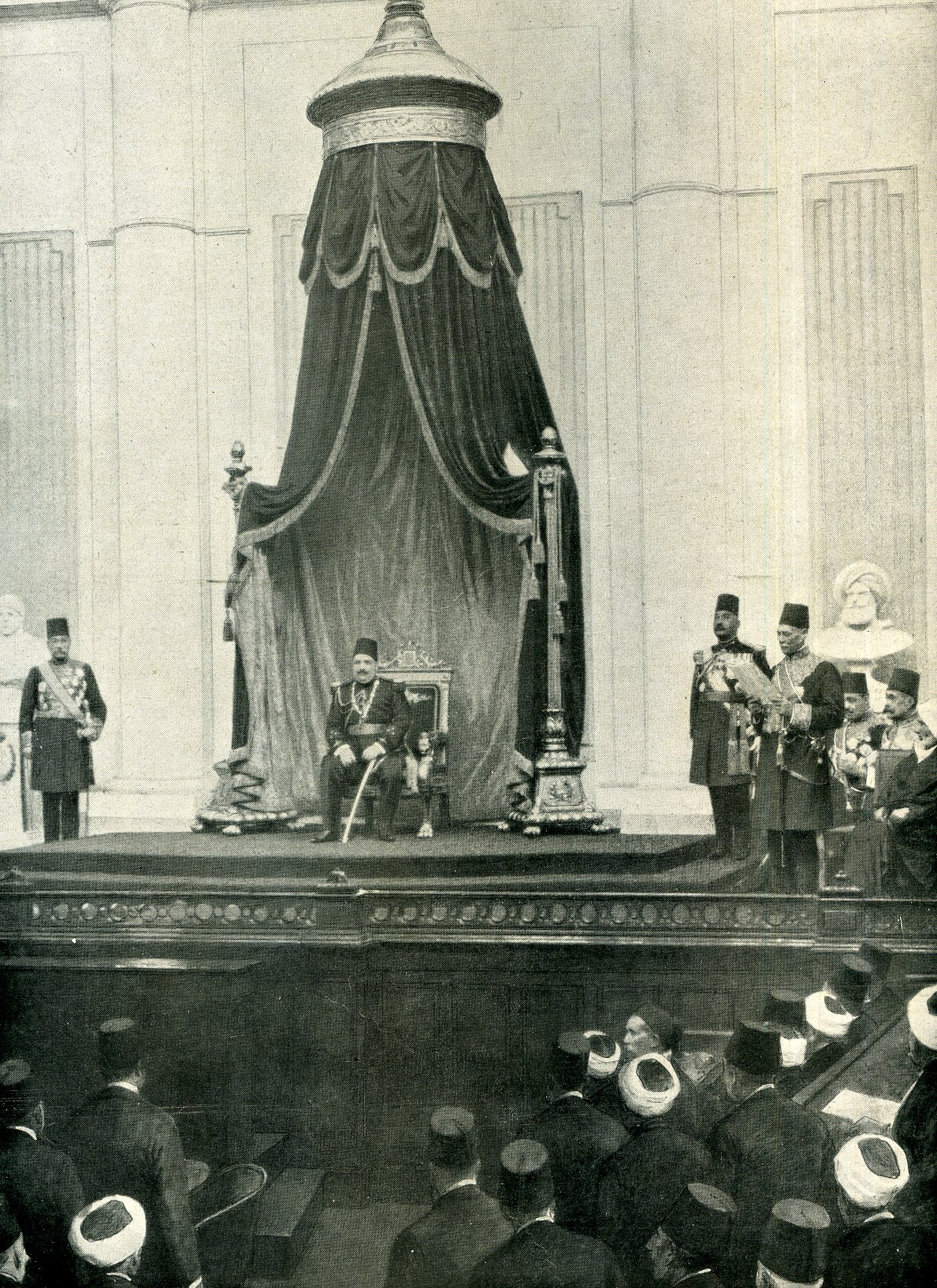
King Fouad opens the parliamentary session, c. 1925

After the end of World War I, the 1919 Egyptian Revolution broke out calling for liberty, independence and democracy. This revolution resulted in the 28 February 1922 declaration which recognized Egypt as an independent state (with some reservations) and terminated Egypt as a British protectorate.

Based on this new status, a new Egyptian Constitution was promulgated in April 1923 by a 30-member legislative committee that included representatives of political parties, as well as national movement leaders.

The 1923 Constitution of Egypt was a previous working constitution of Egypt during the period 1923–1952. It was replaced by the 1930 Constitution for a 5-year period (1930–1935) before being restored in 1935. It adopted the parliamentary representative system based on separation of and cooperation among authorities. The Parliament was bicameral system made up of the Senate and the House of Representatives.

During 1923–1952 Egypt witnessed a remarkable experience rich in political and democratic practices, however, such an experience was marked with many defects such as the British occupation, foreign intervention in Egypt's affairs and the royal palace's interference in political life.

== After the 1952 Revolution ==
=== Under the 1956 Constitution ===
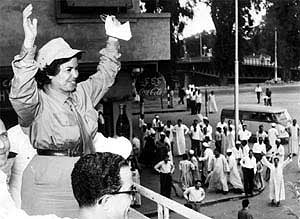
Rawya Ateya used her military experience as a political asset during her 1957 electoral campaign, with her appearance in uniform at rallies.

In 1956, the new Constitution was proclaimed stipulating for the formation of the National Assembly on 22 July 1957 with the membership of 350 elected members. However it effective until 10 February 1958, when the Egyptian-Syrian merger was given force and the 1956 Constitution revoked.

=== Under the UAR Constitution ===
The Provisional Constitution of the United Arab Republic was formulated in March 1958, and a joint National Assembly was established, its members were appointed (400 from Egypt and 200 from Syria). It first met on 21 July 1960 and lasted to 22 June 1961. Egypt and Syria were later separated on 28 September 1961.

=== Under the 1963 provisional Constitution ===
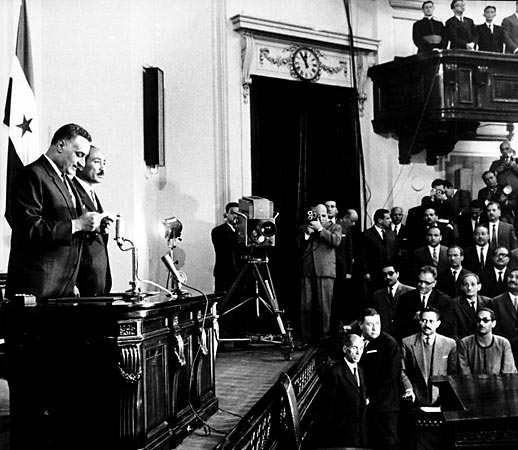
President elect Gamal Abdel Nasser takes presidential oath for his second term as president, beside him is Speaker of the People's Assembly Anwar Sadat, on 25 March 1965

In March 1964, a further provisional Constitution was declared, giving birth to a 350-elected member National Assembly, half of whom at least from workers and farmers - in reaction to the then July 1961 socialist laws plus 10 members appointed by the President of the Republic. This Assembly lasted from 26 March 1964 to 12 November 1968. New elections were held on 20 January 1969, and the Assembly was valid until 30 August 1971.

=== Under the 1971 Constitution ===
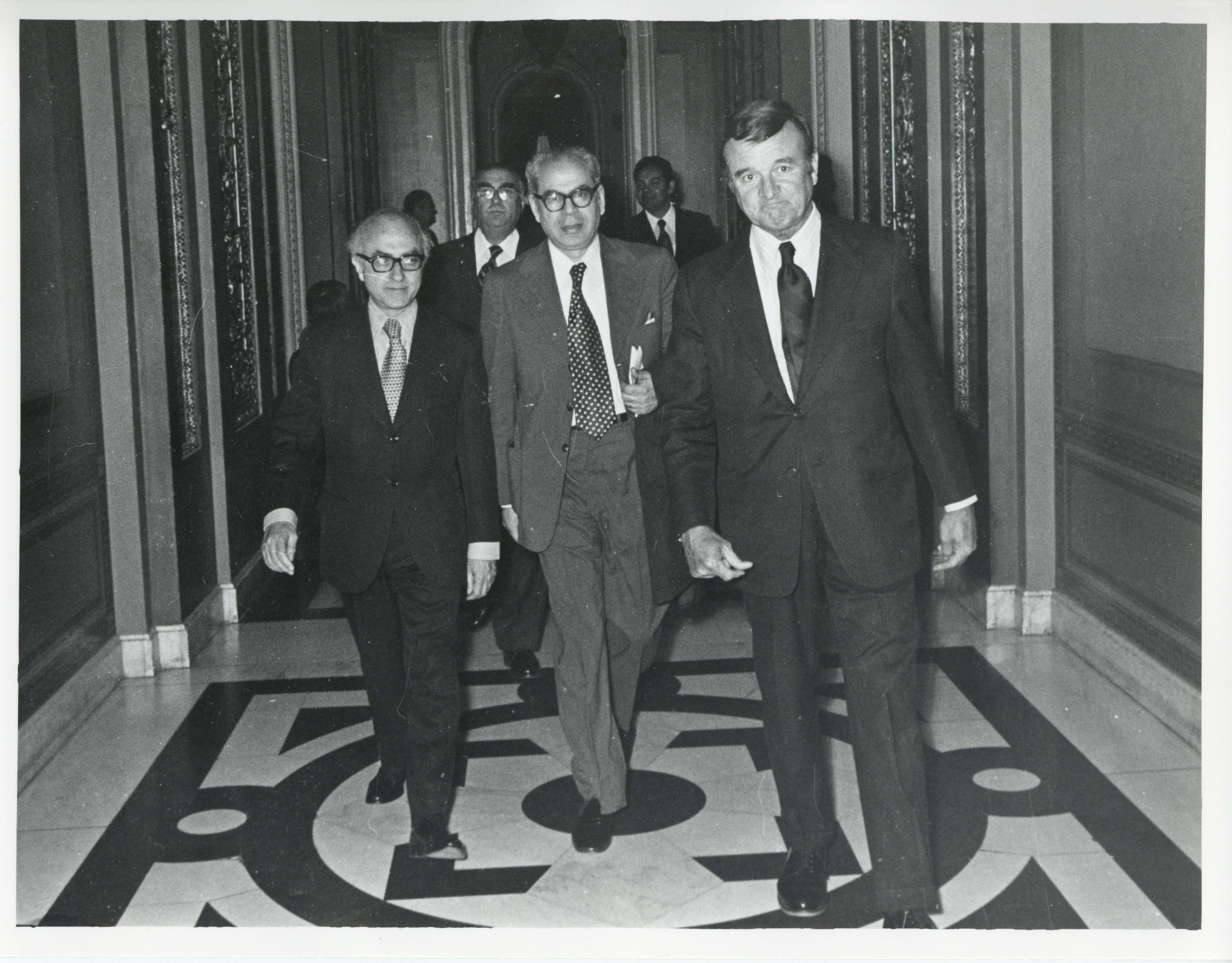
Members of Egyptian Parliament walking down a hall, on 1 May 1975

The Constitution was proclaimed to update the democratic representative system in assertion of the rule of law, independence of Judiciary, and party plurality. Growing democratic changes were discerned, bringing forth legal elections on multi - forum basis within the Arab Socialist Union - the only political gathering at the time. Under the 1971 Constitution, The Egyptian Parliament was bi-cameral, made up of the People's Assembly of Egypt and the Shura Council, with the membership of 454 members, including ten members appointed by the President of the Republic.

The Parliament met for one nine-month session each year: under special circumstances the President of the Republic could call an additional session. Even though the powers of the Parliament have increased since the 1980 Amendments of the Constitution, the Parliament lacked the powers to effectively balance the powers of the President.

In 1979, party-based legislative elections were conducted for the first time in Egypt after political parties were done with in the wake of the 1952 Revolution. Parties, formed according to the political parties law in 1977, had taken part in the said elections.

In 1980, the Shura Council was set up to broaden the scope of political and democratic participation.

Decreed amendments were introduced to the People's Assembly electoral system in pursuit of the best popular representation.

In 1983, the party-list and proportional representation were adopted as the electoral process, in which political parties participated. In 1986, a law modifying the electoral process, the basis of relating party lists to the individual majority system was issued.

However, experience yielded the return to the individual majority system in 1990. The Republic was divided into 222 constituencies, two members for each constituency, one at least from laborers and farmers.

==== People's Assembly ====
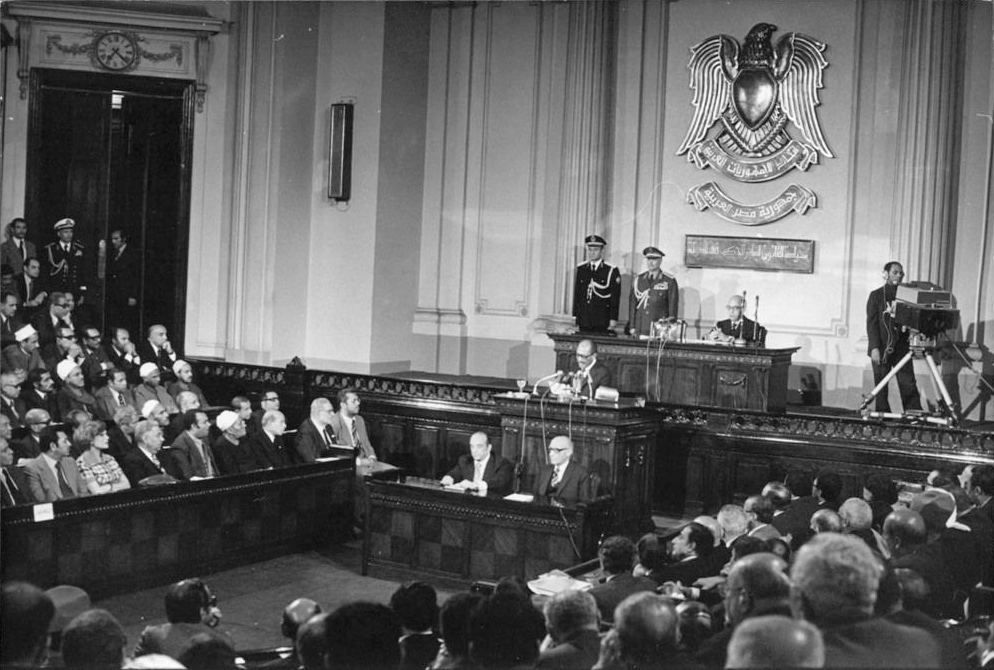
The People's Assembly in full session with President Anwar Sadat delivering a speech to the Assembly members, 1977

The People's Assembly was the lower house and was formed in 1971 as a result of the adoption of the new constitution. The Assembly is made up of 454 deputies, 444 of whom are directly elected while the remaining 10 are appointed by the President of the Republic. The Constitution reserves 50 percent of the Assembly's seats for "workers and farmers", one per each two seat constituency. The Assembly sits for a five-year term but can be dissolved earlier by the president. All seats are voted on in each election.

==== Shura Council ====
The Shura Council was the upper house. Its name roughly translates into English as "the Consultative Council". The council was created in 1980 through a constitutional amendment. The council was composed of 264 members of which 174 members are directly elected and the 88 are appointed by the President of the Republic for six-year terms. Membership was rotating, with one half of the Council renewed every three years. The Shura Council's legislative powers were limited. On most matters of legislation, the People's Assembly retained the last word in the event of a disagreement between the two houses. The 130-year-old Shura Council building was completely burnt on 19 August 2008. The council was abolished in the 2013 draft constitution; the constitution has been passed, meaning that the abolition is final.

==== Functional Structure ====
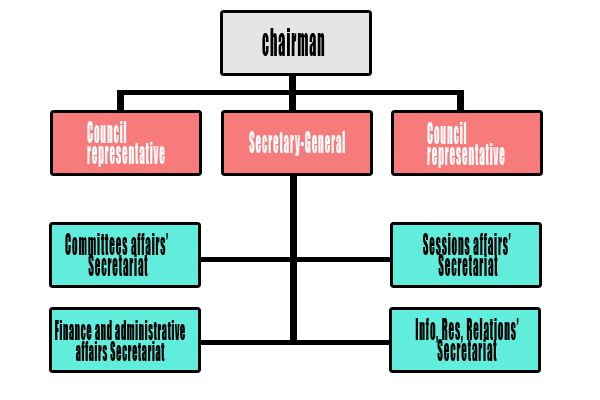

=== Post-2011 overthrow of Mubarak ===
Parliament was dissolved repeatedly in the aftermath of the overthrow of Mubarak; The Parliament elected in 2010, under Mubarak, was dissolved by the Supreme Council of the Armed Forces in 2011. A new Parliament was elected at the end of 2011/beginning of 2012. This Parliament was dominated by islamist political parties and dissolved by the Supreme Constitutional Court in June 2012 then restored by order of elected president Mohamed Morsi in July 2012, and then dissolved again by order of the interim president Adly Mansour in 2013.

For three years Egypt did not have a parliament but in October–December 2015, elections were held for a new House of Representatives. The elected parliament will be entrusted with the task of reviewing the laws that were passed while a parliament was not in session.

== Egyptian Parliamentary Bodies ==
=== High Council ===
In May 1805, the Ulama (religious scholars) of Al-Azhar led the lower-case mature democratic revolution Egypt witnessed. All classes of the society took part in that revolution whose leader named Mohammed Ali before the Ottoman Sultan could send a wali of his own. Mohammed Ali had pledged his allegiance to the people based on the principle the nation is the source of authority. Those conditions stipulated that he administers justice, implements judgments and legislations, and acts only after their consultation; otherwise he would be removed?.

Immediately after assuming power, Mohamad Ali started a comprehensive administrative revolution with a view to establishing modern institutions, including a representative council.

In 1824, The High Council was established. It was the true beginning of a representative council whose members were partly elected and represented all classes of the people. At first it consisted of 24 members, then 48 members after adding 24 Sheikhs of Al-Azher university, two merchants were chosen by the merchants, Chief of the capital, two accountants, and two notables from each province who were elected by the populace.

In January 1825, the High Council issued a basic statute. It stated that its function was to discuss whatever Mohammad Ali suggested or postulated with regard to his domestic policy. The statute also stated session dates and procedures.

=== Consultation Council ===
In 1829, the High Council's success in performing its functions led to the establishment of the Consultation Council which was the starting point of the Shoura (consultation) system. It consisted of high-ranking government employees, Ulama, and dignitaries, chaired by Ibrahim Pasha, the son of Mohammad Ali. That Council was like a general assembly consisting of 156 members, 33 of whom were high-ranking employees and Ulama, 24 province superintendents, and 99 Egyptian dignitaries elected by the people.

The Consultation Council held its sessions to give consultation in the fields of education, administration, and public works. In 1830 that Council?s rules of procedure was issued, and in 1833 the Council enacted a special law to complement its rules of procedure and organize work of relevance.

In 1837, Mohammad Ali promulgated the State Basic Law which subtitled the Consultation Council with the Special Legislative Council and The General Legislative Council, to discuss the matters referred there-to by the government. Then the Cabinet was made up of seven basic Portfolios.

=== Representative Consultative Council ===
The year 1866 witnessed the most important development in Egyptian parliamentary life when Khedive Ismail established the Advisory Council of Representatives. That Council was the first with representative functions. The Khedive decree on establishing this council was issued in November 1866, which included the standing order of rules and procedures of the council. The standing order consisted of eighteen articles that established the election system, candidate eligibility requirements and Assembly legislative terms. It included as well probing domestic affairs and forwarding recommendations to the Khedive. The council's standing order and rules of procedure were highly influenced by contemporary European, particularly French, parliamentary systems.

The Advisory Council of Representatives consisted of 75 members elected by dignitaries in Cairo, Alexandria and Damietta, as well as the Undas, (village chiefs) and sheikhs in other provinces. They were elected for the first time in Khedive Ismail's reign, in addition to the Speaker who was appointed by a royal decree.

The council's mandate was three years, and it remained in session for two months each year. It held nine sessions in three legislative terms (25 November 1866 – 6 July 1879).

With the lapse of time, the council's competences expanded, and opposition trends started to appear. This development emanated from the beacon schools spread by a group of leading intellects and writers, as well as newspapers, which stressed the need to establish a representative council that sustains more competences in legislation as much as in control.

In 1878, the first cabinet of ministers was created, and the parliament re-established and given more powers of exercise (although some matters, like financial affairs, remained outside its competences).

In June 1879, the new standing order of the Advisory Council of Representatives was prepared for issuance by the Khedive (Head of State). It stated that the Council consisted of 120 members for Egypt and the Sudan. The most important provision of that standing order was the accountability of the ministers. It gave the council more influence in financial matters. However, Khedive Tawfiq, who was crowned on 26, June 1879, derogated the standing order and abolished the council. But the Council remained in session till July 1879.

=== Egyptian Representative Council ===
September 9, 1881, marked the rise of the Orabi Revolution which called for establishing the Council of Representatives. Elections were held according to the standing order issued in 1866. The new council called The Egyptian Council of Representatives was inaugurated on September 26, 1881, whereby a government decree was issued on February 7, 1882, pending the government's approval of a new basic law. That basic law held the Cabinet accountable to the Representative Council elected by the people, which had the authority to legislate and interpellate the minister. The Egyptian Council of Representatives term was five years, and each session was three months.

Thus, the basis of democratic practice were gradually established. However, this did not last long, as the Egyptian Council of Representatives had held one ordinary session (December 26, 1881 – March 26, 1882) before Britain occupied Egypt and repealed the basic law. In 1883, the so-called Regular Law was issued which constituted a setback to representative life in Egypt.

=== Laws Consultative Council ===
The Regular Law issued in 1883 stated that the Egyptian parliament consisted of two chambers: The Advisory Council of Laws and the General Assembly. It also established the Councils of Provinces whose function was administrative and legislative, and were entrusted with the election of members of the Advisory Council of Laws.

The Advisory Council of Laws whose term was 6 years consisted of 30 members: 14 appointed members including the Speaker and one of his two deputies, and 16 elected members, including the other Deputy Speaker. On the other hand, the General Assembly consisted of 83 members, 46 elected members and the rest were ex - officio members. The latter were members of the Advisory Council of Laws, whose speaker chaired the General Assembly, and seven ministers.

=== Legislative Assembly ===
In July 1913, both the Advisory Council of Laws and the General Assembly were dissolved, and the Legislative Assembly was established. It consisted of 83 members: 66 elected and 17 appointed. The Regular Law promulgated in July 1913 stated that the Legislative Assembly term would be six years. In fact, the Legislative Assembly lasted from January 22, 1914, till June 17, 1914 when World War I broke out and martial laws were declared in Egypt. Later in December 1914, Britain declared Egypt a British protectorate, and the legislative Assembly session was postponed indefinitely. In 1915 the Regular Law was suspended till the Legislative Assembly was dissolved in April 1923.

=== Under the 1923 Constitution ===
According to the 1923 Constitution, The Egyptian Parliament was bi-cameral, made up of the Senate and the House of Representatives. The constitution also adopted the principle of equal competences for the two houses with some exceptions. All of the members of the House of Representatives were to be elected, for a 5-year term. On the other hand, three-fifths of the Senate members were elected, and the rest were appointed.

The number of members varied along the years the constitution was in effect. The House of Representatives had 214 members in the period 1924–1930, then became 235. The number decreased under the 1923 Constitution which continued in effect during 1931–1934 to become 150. It increased once again under the 1923 Constitution to become 232 for the period 1936–1938. Then the number of members became 264 from 1938 to 1949. It was increased to 319 in 1950 and continued as such up till the 1952 revolution.

Although the parliament established by the 1923 constitution was an advanced step along the course of democracy and representation in Egypt. However, practice was mixed with numerous negative aspects.
Political life in the period 1923–1952 varied between tides of limited popular democracy and ebbs due to intervention by occupation forces and the palace, which led to the dissolution of parliament ten times. Moreover, a new constitution was issued in 1930 and lasted for five years. This was a setback to democratic life until the 1923 constitution was restored in 1935.

Thus, constitutional conditions deteriorated due to internal and external reasons. This deterioration was reflected in a state of political and governmental instability to the extent that Egypt had developed 40 cabinets in the period 1923–1952.

== See also ==
- Parliament of Egypt
- Rawya Ateya, first female parliamentarian in Egypt and the Arab world
- 2011–12 Egyptian parliamentary election
- Egyptian parliamentary election, 2015
