= Hilmi Isa =

Egyptian lawyer and cabinet minister

Muhammad Hilmi Isa Pasha (Arabic: محمد حلمي عيسى (died 1953, Cairo) held ten cabinet posts in Egypt between 1925 and 1941.

== Career ==
Hilmi Isa was born in Ashmun (Manufiya) in 1372 hijra. He graduated with a law degree in 1902. He was a member of the Egyptian parliament.

Hilmi Isa Pasha held several cabinet positions:

- Minister of Transportation, Second Ahmad Ziwar Cabinet (1925-05 to 1925-09-12)
- Minister of the Interior, Second Ahmad Ziwar Cabinet (1925-09-12 to 1925-11-30)
- Minister of Transportation, Second Ahmad Ziwar Cabinet (1925-11-30 to 1926-06-07)
- Minister of Awqaf, First Ismaʿil Sidqi Cabinet (1930-06-19 to 1931-06-10)
- Minister of Transportation, Second Ismaʿil Sidqi Cabinet (1933-01-04 to 1933-09-27)
- Minister of Education, Abdel Fattah Yahya Ibrahim Pasha Cabinet (1933-09-27 to 1934-11-14)
- Minister of Awqaf, Second Muhammad Mahmoud Pasha Cabinet (1937-12-30 to 1938-04-27)
- Minister of Transportation, Third Muhammad Mahmoud Pasha Cabinet (1938-04-27 to 1938-06-24)
- Minister of Justice, Hassan Sabry Pasha Cabinet (1940-06-27 to 1940-11-14)
- Minister of Justice, First Hussein Sirri Pasha Cabinet (1940-11-15 to 1941-07-31)

He was author of a legal study of sale under Egyptian, French, and Islamic law.
