= Trésor de la langue française =

French dictionary

The Trésor de la langue française (French pronunciation: [tʁezɔʁ də la lɑ̃ɡ fʁɑ̃sɛːz]; TLF; "Treasury of the French Language"; subtitled Dictionnaire de la langue du XIXe et du XXe siècle (1789–1960)) is a 16-volume dictionary of 19th- and 20th-century French published by the Centre de Recherche pour un Trésor de la Langue Française from 1971 to 1994. Its electronic edition, the Trésor de la langue française informatisé (TLFi), is available on CD-ROM and on the Web.

== Statistics ==
- 100,000 words with history
- 270,000 definitions
- 430,000 citations

== Volumes ==
- 1971 : vol. 1 - A-Affiner, CXXXIV-878
- 1973 : vol. 2 - Affinerie-Anfractuosité, XIX-987
- 1974 : vol. 3 - Ange-Badin, XXIV-1206 ISBN 2-222-01623-1
- 1975 : vol. 4 - Badinage-Cage, XXIV-1166 ISBN 2-222-01714-9
- 1977 : vol. 5 - Cageot-Constat, XXIV-1425 ISBN 2-222-01977-X
- 1978 : vol. 6 - Constatation-Désobliger, XVI-1308 ISBN 2-222-02156-1
- 1979 : vol. 7 - Désobstruer-Épicurisme, XXIII-1343 ISBN 2-222-02383-1
- 1980 : vol. 8 - Épicycle-Fuyard, XIX-1364 ISBN 2-222-02670-9
- 1981 : vol. 9 - G-Incarner, XVIII-1338 ISBN 2-222-03049-8
- 1983 : vol. 10 - Incartade-Losangique, XXI-1381 ISBN 2-222-03269-5
- 1985 : vol. 11 - Lot-Natalité, XVIII-1339 ISBN 2-07-077011-7
- 1986 : vol. 12 - Natation-Pénétrer, XIX-1337 ISBN 2-07-077012-5
- 1988 : vol. 13 - Pénible-Ptarmigan, XIX-1449 ISBN 2-07-077013-3
- 1990 : vol. 14 - Ptère-Salaud, XVII-1451 ISBN 2-07-077014-1
- 1992 : vol. 15 - Sale-Teindre, XVIII-1451 ISBN 2-07-077015-X
- 1994 : vol. 16 - Teint-Zzz, XVIII-1452 ISBN 2-07-077016-8
