= Moses Levi =

Ottoman rabbi (1827–1910)

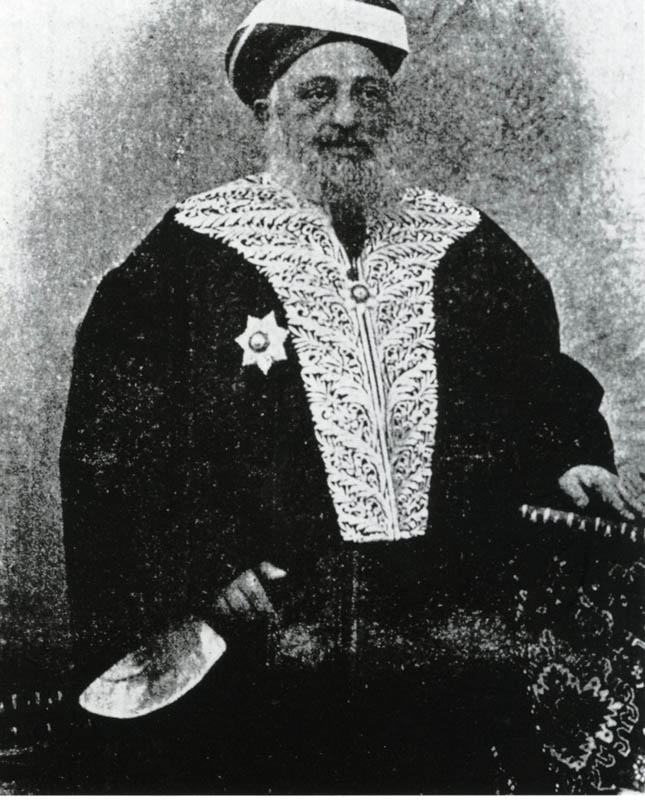
Moses Levi, circa 1880

Moses Levi (or Moshe HaLevi Effendi) (1827–1910) was the Chief Rabbi (Hakham Bashi) of Constantinople and of the Ottoman Empire.

Levi was first appointed to the rabbinical court at the behest of his father. He later was appointed to the position of chief rabbi following the emigration of Rabbi Yakir Giron.
