= Historical dictionary =

Dictionary covering the historical development of forms and meanings of words

A historical dictionary or dictionary on historical principles is a dictionary which deals not only with the latterday meanings of words but also the historical development of their forms and meanings. It may also describe the vocabulary of an earlier stage of a language's development without covering present-day usage at all. A historical dictionary is primarily of interest to scholars of language, but may also be used as a general dictionary.

== Features ==
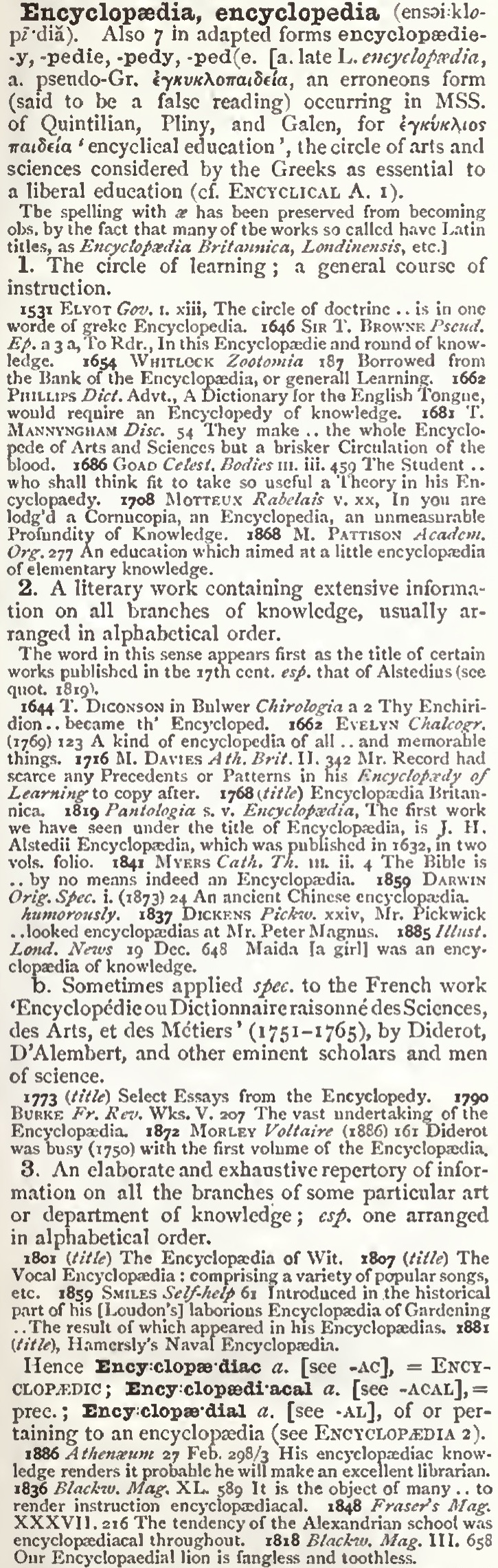
Example of an entry from a historical dictionary ('encyclopedia' from the New English Dictionary), showing use of cited quotations and chronological ordering of senses

Typical features of a historical dictionary are:

- Senses of words listed in the order they were first used, allowing the development of meaning over time to be seen
- Comprehensive etymological information, often directly referencing academic research on word history
- Use of illustrative quotations, complete with citations of their sources, providing references and proof of a word's actual existence and use in a given time period
- Dates of first use (and, for obsolete usages, last use) with each word and each sense of each word (if there are quotations in the dictionary, the first quotation is usually the very first example which is known)

However, not all dictionaries which are called 'historical' have all of these features. For example, the Shorter Oxford English Dictionary includes only minimal quotations, with most entries having only an approximate date of first use, and the Webster's New International Dictionary (which, though it does not market itself as historical, is founded on historical principles) features only dates of first use and does not order its senses chronologically.

== History ==
For some languages, like Sanskrit and Greek, the historical dictionary (in the sense of a word-list explaining the meanings of words that were obsolete at the time of their compilation) was the first form of dictionary developed; though not being scholarly historical dictionaries in the modern sense, they did give a sense of semantic change over time. Early modern European dictionaries also often included a significant historical element, without being fully historical in form; for instance, Samuel Johnson's Dictionary of the English Language (1755) included quotations from admired writers as well as some words that were obsolete or obsolescent by the mid 18th century.

Modern historical principles emerged with the publication of John Jamieson's Etymological Dictionary of the Scottish Language (1808). Like modern historical dictionaries, Jamieson attempted to find the earliest use of each word, and printed quotations in chronological order demonstrating the changes which had occurred to that word throughout history.

In 1812 the German classicist Franz Passow laid out his plan for a comprehensive dictionary of the Greek language which would 'set out [...] the life story of each single word in a conveniently ordered overviews', which was completed as the Handwörterbuch der griechischen Sprache in 1824. This idea was transmitted to the English-speaking world through the work of Liddell and Scott on their Greek–English Lexicon (1843), based on a translation of Passow's work into English. However, it was not until the beginning of the Deutsches Wörterbuch project of the Brothers Grimm in 1838 that a historical dictionary of a modern language was attempted.

Throughout the later nineteenth century numerous historical dictionary projects were started for the various languages of Europe. The main historical dictionary of English, the Oxford English Dictionary, was initiated in 1857 and was completed in 1928.

Recently the availability of historical text corpora and other large text databases such as digital newspaper archives have begun to influence historical dictionaries. The Trésor de la langue française was the first historical dictionary to be based mainly on a computerized corpus. Most recent historical dictionaries and historical dictionary revision projects have been based on a mixture of quotations taken down by hand and texts from corpora.

== Compilation ==
Because of their size and scope, the compilation of historical dictionaries takes significantly longer than the compilation of general dictionaries. This is often exacerbated by the scholarly nature and limited audience for the works, meaning that the budget is often limited; historical dictionary projects often survive on a grant-to-grant basis, seeking new funding for each new section of the work. Some historical dictionaries, such as Jonathan Lighter's Historical Dictionary of American Slang, have proven to be so expensive for their publishers that they have ended production before the dictionary was completed.

Traditionally historical dictionaries were produced by employing a large number of readers to read and excerpt from historical texts into individual pieces of paper, which were then collated into alphabetical order and referred to during the compilation of the relevant entry. The Oxford English Dictionary, for example, established a reading programme at its foundation which continues to this day. The advent of computerized full-text search databases and techniques means that lexicographers can now make use of corpora of documents to gain a more balanced view of the history of a particular word or phrase, as well as finding new quotation material to fill gaps in the history of some words; some lexicographers have noted, however, that electronic search is not a complete replacement for manual quotation-gathering, among other things because though it can help finding examples of a word already known to exist, full-text search is less good at identifying which words need to be researched in the first place.

== Examples ==
=== Anglic ===
The Oxford English Dictionary is the largest and most popular historical dictionary of the English language, with an aim to cover all words which saw some significant use at any time between the early Middle English period and the present day.

The earlier history of English is covered in more detail by the Middle English Dictionary (1954–2001) and the Dictionary of Old English (1986–present). Despite efforts made at time of the founding of the Middle English Dictionary project to produce a dictionary of Early Modern English, this never came to fruition.

Several historical dictionaries exist which cover the dialects and regionalisms particular to certain geographical areas, like the English Dialect Dictionary, the Scottish National Dictionary and the Dictionary of the Older Scottish Tongue, the Dictionary of American Regional English, the Dictionary of Canadianisms on Historical Principles, and the Australian National Dictionary.

Uniquely, from the 1960s to the 2000s, a historical thesaurus was produced for English, which inverts the traditional historical dictionary by showing the development of concepts into words, rather than the development of words to describe different concepts. The Historical Thesaurus of English was published in 2009 and is largely based on data from the Oxford English Dictionary; a similar project is now underway for the Scots language.

=== Belarusian ===
The Гістарычны слоўнік беларускай мовы [Historical Dictionary of the Belarusian language] published in years 1982–2017 by Belarusian Academy of Sciences includes 37 volumes.

=== Dutch ===
The Woordenboek der Nederlandsche Taal is the largest dictionary of the Dutch language, founded on historical principles and published from 1864 to 1998, with a supplement following in 2001.

=== French ===
- Dictionnaire de la langue française
- Trésor de la langue française
- Dictionnaire historique de la langue française

=== German ===
The largest historical dictionary of German is the Deutsches Wörterbuch originally compiled by Jacob and Wilhelm Grimm and completed after their death in 1961. A second edition of the letters A–F was completed in 2016.

There is also the Deutsches Fremdwörterbuch which exclusively covers words loaned into German from other languages, which were largely (though not entirely) omitted from the Grimm dictionary.

There is also a Frühneuhochdeutsches Wörterbuch covering Early Modern German, the Mittelhochdeutsches Wörterbuch covering Middle High German, and an Althochdeutsches Wörterbuch covering Old High German.

=== Irish ===
- Dictionary of the Irish Language

=== Italian ===
- Grande dizionario della lingua italiana

=== Latin ===
The Thesaurus Linguae Latinae underway in Munich is intended to be a complete historical dictionary of classical Latin.

The International Union of Academies undertook in 1924 to compile a series of national dictionaries of Latin in each of its member academies; for instance, the British Academy produced the Dictionary of Medieval Latin from British Sources.

=== Serbo-Croatian ===
- Đuro Daničić: Рјечник из књижевних старина српских [Dictionary of Serbian Literary Antiquities] (1863–1864)
- Rječnik hrvatskoga ili srpskoga jezika (1880–1976), initiated by Đuro Daničić
- Речник српскохрватског књижевног и народног језика [Dictionary of Serbo-Croatian Literary and Vernacular Language] (1959–present), initiated by Aleksandar Belić
- Rječnik hrvatskoga kajkavskoga književnog jezika [Dictionary of Croatian Kajkavian Literary Language] (1984–present)
- Rječnik hrvatskoga književnoga jezika od preporoda do I. G. Kovačića [Dictionary of Croatian Literary Language from the Croatian national revival to Ivan Goran Kovačić] (1985–present), initiated by Julije Benešić

=== Swedish ===
The Svenska Akademiens ordbok (Dictionary of the Swedish Academy) is a multivolume historical dictionary (also available online) which was completed in 2023.

=== Welsh ===
- Geiriadur Prifysgol Cymru (Dictionary of the Welsh Language)

== See also ==
- Etymological dictionary
- Historical linguistics
