= Douglas Century =

Douglas J. Century
- Born: Calgary, Alberta
- Education: Princeton University (BA)
- Occupations: Nonfiction author, investigative journalist
- Years active: 1985–present
- Agent: Creative Artists Agency
- Notable work: Crash of the Heavens (2025); Split Decision (2023); The Last Boss of Brighton (2022); No Surrender (2020); Hunting El Chapo (2018); Ice T (2012); Barney Ross(2009); Brotherhood of Warriors (2009); Takedown: The Fall of the Last Mafia Empire (2002); Street Kingdom (1999)
- Website: douglascentury.com

Douglas Century is a Canadian-American investigative journalist and bestselling nonfiction author. He is author of the 2025 biography of Hannah Senesh, retelling her WWII paratrooper mission behind enemy lines; author of the 2022 biography of Russian mobster Boris Nayfeld; author of the 2009 biography of Barney Ross, and, coauthor of the 2012 autobiography of Ice T.

== Personal life and education ==
Douglas Century was born in Calgary, Alberta, Canada. The son of Jewish-American expatriate parents, Century attended Henry Wise Wood High School, then majored in English at Princeton University. He graduated cum laude with a Bachelor of Arts degree in 1986.

== Career ==
Douglas Century began his career in the 1990s working as cultural writer for various news publications including The Forward, The New York Times and The Guardian. Century closely covered what many consider the "Golden Age" of hip hop, interviewing and writing about LL Cool J, Jay-Z, Nas, Busta Rhymes, Cam'ron, Ananda Lewis and Russell Simmons for the New York Times and other leading publications.

Century has written about some of the most intriguing individuals of the 20th century, including Hannah Szenes, Jack H. Jacobs, Sully Sullenberger, Roddie Edmonds, Barney Ross, Ananda Lewis, Ice T, El Chapo and Boris Nayfeld.

== Works ==
- Street Kingdom: Five Years Inside the Franklin Avenue Posse (1999)
- Takedown: The Fall of the Last Mafia Empire (2002)
- Barney Ross: The Life of a Jewish Fighter (2006)
- Brotherhood of Warriors: Behind Enemy Lines with a Commando in One of the World's Most Elite Counterterrorism Units (2008)
- If Not Now, When?: Duty and Sacrifice in America's TIme of Need (2008)
- Split Decision: Life Stories (2009)
- Ice: A Memoir of Gangster Life and Redemption—from South Central to Hollywood (2011)
- Hunting El Chapo: The Inside Story Of The American Lawman Who Captured The World's Most-wanted Drug Lord (2019)
- No Surrender: A Father, A Son, And An Extraordinary Act Of Heroism That Continues To Live On Today (2019)
- The Last Boss of Brighton: Boris "Biba" Nayfeld and the Rise of the Russian Mob in America (2022)
- Crash of the Heavens: The Remarkable Story of Hannah Senesh and the Only Military Mission to Rescue Europe's Jews During World War II (2025)

== Reception ==
=== Street Kingdom: Five Years Inside the Franklin Avenue Posse ===
Century's first book, Street Kingdom: Five Years Inside the Franklin Avenue Posse, was cited by many critics as a significant work of "participatory journalism." "(It) merits a place alongside The Grapes Of Wrath and Native Son," wrote the Detroit Free Press in February 1998. "Street Kingdom... is an inventive mix of courageous investigative reporting, accomplished storytelling, knowing social commentary and wicked street-smart prose... One of the miracles of this book is that it occurred at all." Publishers Weekly called the debut book, "At once mesmerizing, humorous and tragic... a heady mixture of reportage and memoir."

=== Takedown: The Fall of the Last Mafia Empire ===
Century's second book, about Operation Wasteland, was Takedown: The Fall of the Last Mafia Empire (coauthored with NYPD Detective First-Grade Rick Cowan) was a The New York Times best-seller, a finalist for the 2003 Edgar Award ("Best Fact Crime"), and a finalist for the 2003 Audie Awards ("Best Audiobook of the Year, Non-Fiction, Abridged," as read by actor Christopher Meloni). Newsweek says the book is a "new gangland epic."

=== Barney Ross: The Life of a Jewish Fighter ===
After the publication of his third book, the best-seller Barney Ross, Century toured extensively, speaking across the United States and Canada about the life and times of Ross (born Dov Ber Rasofsky), the Hall of Fame boxing great and World War II hero. "This is an excellent story of a man and his times," wrote boxing historian Bert Randolph Sugar in The New York Times Book Review. "... proof positive that time does not relinquish its hold over men or monuments. In a sport devoted to fashioning halos for its superstars, Ross wore a special nimbus, and this book properly fits him for that."

=== Brotherhood of Warriors and If Not Now, When? ===
Century is the coauthor of Brotherhood of Warriors: Behind Enemy Lines with a Commando in one of the World’s Most Elite Counterterrorism Units, with former Israeli special forces operative Aaron Cohen, published by Ecco/HarperCollins in April 2008. The book recounts Cohen's work in the mid-1990s as a member of Duvdevan Unit (Hebrew: דובדבן; lit. cherry) a controversial Special Forces outfit which runs missions targeting wanted terrorist suspects in the occupied territories of the West Bank, often while posing in undercover disguise as Palestinian Arabs.

In October 2008, the Penguin Group published the memoir of Congressional Medal of Honor recipient Colonel Jack H. Jacobs, If Not Now, When?: Duty and Sacrifice in America's Time of Need, coauthored by Douglas Century, with a foreword by NBC Nightly News anchor and managing editor Brian Williams. If Not Now, When? won the 2010 Colby Award, recognizing "a first work of fiction or nonfiction that has made a significant contribution to the public's understanding of intelligence operations, military history, or international affairs."

=== In authorship with Ice-T ===
In 2011, Century was a coauthor, with iconic hip-hop artist and actor Ice-T, of Ice: A Memoir of Gangster Life and Redemption—from South Central to Hollywood, published by Random House/One World. The Associated Press said the book is "as cool as its namesake... a fascinating memoir, the pages of which are jam-packed with tales of a guy who ‘actively did everything I rhymed about.’"

The New York Times Book Review said it is the embodiment of "hip-hop's Horatio Alger" myth: "Ice-T, in short, is someone hip-hop might have invented if he hadn't invented himself," reviewer Baz Dreisinger wrote. "A goes-down-easy mélange of memoir, self-help, and amateur criminology. Ultimately, Ice showcases an eminently reasonable, positively likeable guy, the gangsta rapper even a parent could love."

In July 2022, Century again collaborated with Ice-T writing Split Decision: Life Stories (Gallery Books), a dual memoir about Ice-T and his former partner-in-crime, Spike, as well as their early days as jewel thieves and street hustlers in Los Angeles and their vastly diverging life trajectories. Publishers Weekly in a starred review called the book "a propulsive chronicle...This grave and astonishing account will leave fans in awe," while Booklist called Split Decision "an astounding and provocative tale... a powerful memoir of diverging lives."

=== Hunting El Chapo: The Inside Story Of The American Lawman Who Captured The World's Most-wanted Drug Lord ===
In April 2018, Century coauthored Hunting El Chapo (HarperCollins) with former DEA Special Agent Andrew Hogan, an account of Hogan's eight-year investigation tracking down and eventually capturing the world's most-wanted drug-trafficker Joaquín Archivaldo Guzmán Loera a.k.a. El Chapo. Dateline profiled Inside the Hunt for El Chapo on April 8, 2018; it was hosted by Lester Holt. The book was published worldwide in many languages including Spanish, French, Italian, Portuguese, German, Dutch, and Japanese. USA Today described the book as "Cinematic... captivating... the most authentic glimpse inside the world of El Chapo—because Hogan actually went there and did what few thought possible."

In March 2017, Variety reported that Sony Pictures with 3 Arts Entertainment optioned Hunting El Chapo for a feature film with Michael Bay set to produce it.

=== No Surrender: A Father, A Son, And An Extraordinary Act Of Heroism That Continues To Live On Today ===
In 2019, Century coauthored No Surrender (Harper One) with Pastor Chris Edmonds, a work of narrative nonfiction chronicling the World War II experiences of Edmond's late father, U.S. Army Master Sgt. Roddie Edmonds of the 106th Infantry Division. Captured during the vicious fighting in the Battle of the Bulge in December 1944, imprisoned in Germany's Stalag IXA, Master Sgt. Edmonds refused the order of a Nazi major to identify the Jewish servicemen among the prisoners saying, "We are all Jews here." For his defense of Jewish servicemen at the POW camp, Edmonds was posthumously awarded the title "Righteous Among the Nations" from Yad Vashem, Israel's highest honor for non-Jews who risked their own lives to save Jews during the Holocaust. Of 25,000 people to receive the award, Edmonds was the fifth of five Americans, and the only active serviceman during World War II.

For writing No Surrender, Century received a 2020 Christopher Award; it was recognized as being one of the best nonfiction books of the year.

=== The Last Boss of Brighton: Boris "Biba" Nayfeld and the Rise of the Russian Mob in America ===
In July 2022, Century published The Last Boss of Brighton (William Morrow), a true crime book which tells the rise and fall of notorious Belarusian-Jewish mobster Boris Nayfeld as well as the history of Soviet-emigre organized crime in the United States. Kirkus Reviews in a starred review called The Last Boss of Brighton "a fascinating, page-turning story of a genuine scoundrel. Century thrillingly chronicles Nayfeld’s criminal career, "True-crime fans will find this one irresistible."

Reviewing the book in the Sunday Telegraph Jack Kerridge called The Last Boss of Brighton "a brilliant, blood-soaked biography ... so enjoyably mayhem-crammed as to make Howard Marks' drug-smuggling memoir Mr Nice read like Barbara Pym... Nayfeld is a fiendishly compelling presence on the page."

In her January 7, 2023, review in the Globe and Mail, Emily Donaldson opined that it is an "exciting" break from true-crime conventions: "Douglas Century’s The Last Boss of Brighton offers up the sordidly riveting tale of Belarusian heroin trafficker Boris Nayfeld... The stories themselves are as mind-boggling in their extremity as they are disarming in their honesty. As he recounts, in granular detail, crimes ranging from pickpocketing to violent hold-ups to a massive gas-tax swindling scheme that netted him millions, Nayfeld gives us a tour of a parallel criminal world, with all its attendant rules and 'ethics.' Some of The Last Boss’s most head-spinny moments occur when that world intersects with banal aspects of our own."

=== Crash of the Heavens: The Remarkable Story of Hannah Senesh and the Only Military Mission to Rescue Europe's Jews During World War II ===
In November 2025, Century published Crash of the Heavens (Avid Reader Press/Simon & Schuster), a work of narrative nonfiction about Hannah Senesh and the Jewish Parachutists of Mandate Palestine. In addition to Senesh, Century depicts the World War II mission of Jewish resistance fighters Enzo Sereni, Haviva Reik, Reuven Dafni and Yeshayahu "Shaike Dan" Trachtenberg.

In The Wall Street Journal, reviewer James S. Hirsch wrote: "Douglas Century's Crash of the Heavens brings to life the headstrong, charismatic heroine who was both a fearless warrior and a precocious writer....Mr. Century, a veteran investigative journalist, has drawn on [her] writings, as well as many other firsthand accounts, to give his narrative a rich, novelistic sheen. Structurally, Mr. Century uses short chapters to create a tick-tock cadence of Senesh's final months while also broadening his lens to capture the courageous exploits and casual barbarisms of a genocidal age. In cinematic detail, the author limns the visceral intensity of a world gone mad."

Reviewing Crash of the Heavens for The Jewish Book Council on November 17, 2025, Jeffrey K. Salkin noted: “Douglas Century retells Hannah Senesh’s story with a vital urgency and relevance for today. The result: a page-turner of a book that reads almost like a novel. . . . Much of the historiography of the Holocaust focuses on men, and when it tells women’s stories, they tend to be victims. We cannot only know about Anne Frank’s attic. We must also know of Hannah Senesh's parachute."

Kirkus Reviews was similarly enthusiastic in its assessment: “In breathless prose and cinematic detail, the book presents the men and women from all backgrounds joined in concert to save something of European Jewry. We hear the roar of airplane engines, feel the wind as they jump, and brace for impact as they land. We follow them through Eastern European woodlands and shadow them through city streets. . . . This is a book of inspiration for our time, when heroism and self-sacrifice have lost their luster."

On February 18, 2026, the Jewish Book Council announced that Crash of the Heavens was a Finalist for the 75th National Jewish Book Awards in the category of Biography.

In early March 2026, Century and Israeli American rapper Kosha Dillz announced their collaboration on the song "Hannah Senesh." Kosha Dillz said on Instagram that he was inspired to write about Senesh and her role as one of the Jewish Parachutists of Mandate Palestine when Century sent him an advance reader's edition of Crash of the Heavens in late 2025.

== Critical studies and reviews ==
- "Punching Through" Barney Ross reviewed in The New York Times Book Review by Bert Randolph Sugar, February 19, 2006.
- "Two-Fisted Hero" Barney Ross reviewed in The Washington Post by Jonathan Yardley, January 17, 2006.
- "A Jew in the Modern World" Barney Ross reviewed in The New York Sun by Carl Rollyson, February 8, 2006.
- "Ice-T, Living Out Loud," Ice reviewed in The New York Times Book Review by Baz Dreisinger, April 22, 2011.
- Gladwell, Malcolm (May 18, 2015). "Mirror stage : a memoir of working undercover for the Drug Enforcement Administration". The Critics. Books. The New Yorker. Vol. 91, no. 13. pp. 93–96. Review of The Dark Art.
- Hirsch, James S. "‘Crash of the Heavens’ Review: A Mission for Heroes." The Wall Street Journal. November 18, 2025.
- Salkin, Jeffrey K. "Crash of the Heavens: The Remarkable Story of Hannah Senesh and the Only Military Mission to Rescue Europe’s Jews During World War II". The Jewish Book Council. November 17, 2025.

== Bibliography ==
- Street Kingdom: Five Years Inside the Franklin Avenue Posse (New York: Warner Books, 1999), a portrait of hip-hop and gangster subculture set in Brooklyn.
- Takedown: The Fall of the Last Mafia Empire, (New York: G.P. Putnam's Sons, 2002), an investigative account of Operation Wasteland co-authored with NYPD Detective Rick Cowan.
- Barney Ross (New York: Nextbook/Schocken: 2006), a biography of the legendary Jewish boxing champion Barney Ross and Silver Star-awarded U.S. Marine Corps hero of the Battle of Guadalcanal.
- Brotherhood of Warriors: Behind Enemy Lines with a Commando in one of the World’s Most Elite Counterterrorism Units, by Aaron Cohen and Douglas Century (New York: Ecco, 2008).
- If Not Now, When?: Duty and Sacrifice In America's Time of Need, by Colonel Jack Jacobs (Ret.) and Douglas Century (New York: Berkley Caliber, 2008), a memoir of the famed Congressional Medal of Honor recipient and NBC military analyst. Winner of the 2010 Colby Award.
- Ice: A Memoir of Gangster Life and Redemption—from South Central to Hollywood, by Ice-T and Douglas Century (New York: Random House, 2011). ISBN 978-0-345-52328-0.
- The Dark Art: My Undercover Life in Global Narcoterrorism (New York: Gotham Books, 2014), coauthored with retired DEA Special Agent Edward Follis.
- Hunting El Chapo: The Inside Story of the American Lawman Who Captured the World's Most-Wanted Drug Lord, (New York: HarperCollins, 2018) a detailed nonfiction account of the eight-year investigation and manhunt for Mexican narcotrafficker Joaquín Archivaldo Guzmán Loera a.k.a. "El Chapo" – leader of the Sinaloa Cartel (Spanish: Cártel de Sinaloa); coauthored with former DEA Special Agent Andrew Hogan.
- No Surrender: A Father, a Son, and an Extraordinary Act of Heroism That Continues to Live on Today, (New York: Harper One, 2019) coauthored with Pastor Chris Edmonds. Winner of a 2020 Christopher Award.
- The Last Boss of Brighton: Boris "Biba" Nayfeld and the Rise of the Russian Mob in America, (New York: William Morrow, 2022).
- Split Decision: Life Stories (New York: Gallery Books, 2022) by Ice-T & Spike and Douglas Century.
- Crash of the Heavens: The Remarkable Story of Hannah Senesh and the Only Military Mission to Rescue Europe's Jews During World War II (Avid Reader Press/Simon & Schuster, 2025).

=== Essays and reporting ===
- "For Now, Ananda Lewis Is the 'I' in V.I.P.,"exclusive one on one with Ananda Lewis, by Douglas Century, The New York Times, November 21, 1999.
- "My Brooklyn: Still a Contender on the Waterfront," by Douglas Century, The New York Times, March 12, 1999.
- "Not So Fly for This White Guy," by Douglas Century, The New York Times, January 31, 1999.
- "Rhymes and reason," an intimate portrait of the man behind the Busta Rhymes name, by Douglas Century, The Guardian, January 26, 2002.
- "Alpine, NJ: Home to Hip-Hop Royalty," by Douglas Century, The New York Times, Arts & Leisure, February 11, 2007.
- "The Blatnoy," by Douglas Century, Tablet Magazine, August 29, 2022.
- "Opinion: Vladimir Putin is the Most Brazen, Powerful and Wealthy Mobster of All Time," by Douglas Century, Globe and Mail, July 23, 2022.
