= Yoel Palgi =

Israeli Palmach parachutist (1918-1978)

- יואל פלגי
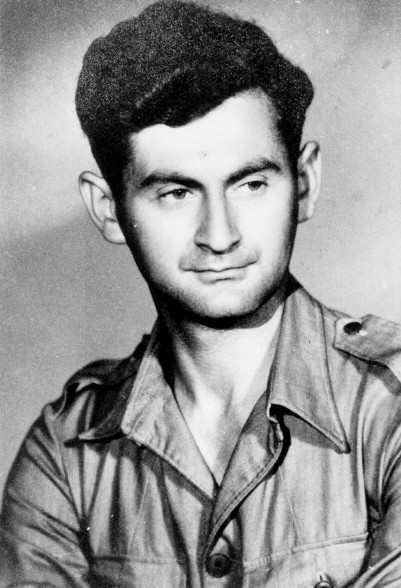
- between 1942 and 1944
- Born: Emil Nussbacher; 1918; Cluj, Austria-Hungary
- Died: 1978 (aged 59–60)
- Spouse: Phyllis Palgi
- Military career
- Allegiance: Israel
- Branch: Palmach
- Other work: Deputy Director of El Al; Director of Civil Aviation; Ambassador to Tanzania

Yoel Palgi (Hebrew: יואל פלגי; born Emil Nussbacher (Note: Often transcribed Nusbacher.) 1918–1978) was a Palmach parachutist who was dropped by Britain into Yugoslavia during the Second World War to assist in the rescue of Hungarian Jews from the Holocaust and RAF pilots captured by the Germans.

== Early life ==
Palgi was born in Cluj, Austria-Hungary (now in Romania) in 1918. In 1939, he made aliyah and joined Kibbutz Afikim in Mandatory Palestine.

== Operation background ==
The Yishuv in Mandatory Palestine had attempted one operation earlier in Romania to provide succour to Jews threatened by the Nazi Holocaust by thwarting their deportation to concentration camps, but it had been compromised, and the two agents dispatched, Arye Fichman of Kibbutz Beit Oren and Liova Gukowsky (Ahisar) Kibbutz Yagur, were captured because the foreign contacts used were often triple or quadruple agents who were German officers who would pass on the details of these kinds of operation. The failure rate of Allied operations to penetrate into that country was high, and it was decided to focus efforts on gaining a toehold in Yugoslavia instead.

== Preparations ==
Palgi had joined the Palmach, the strike force of Haganah and underground army of the Jewish community in Palestine, in 1942. In the following year, he volunteered, together with Peretz Goldstein, to partake in another Yishuv operation into German-occupied Europe. Both Palgi and Goldstein were members of the Ma'agan community, a group of Hungarians formed around the area of the Sea of Galilee, (Note: This informal community of Hungarians called itself Ma'agan, and later established the kibbutz of that name in 1949. In 1941 they relocated to Hatzer Kinneret.) and Goldstein, like Palgi, had also been born in Cluj. The group were required to enlist in the British army and underwent training in Ramat David and Cairo, and, after completing their course, were issued with weapons, silk maps and cyanide pills. Two further measures were taken: they were promoted to officer rank in order to endow them with a certain status if captured, and, secondly, they underwrote insurance policies which, if they were killed, would ensure that their kibbutzim would be compensated for their sacrifice. There was also a personal dimension for many of those who volunteered. Palgi's family was still behind enemy lines in Cluj. Such anxieties were soon to be exacerbated by news that in March Germany had invaded Hungary.

== The mission launched ==
The volunteers were split into two groups, with one, consisting of Hannah Szenes, Abba Berdiczew, Reuven Dafni and a Ma'agan member, Jona Rozen, parachuting into the north of Yugoslavia on 14 March. Palgi's group were flown to Bari where they met up with Enzo Sereni. They were scheduled to make their drop on the first night of Passover, 7 April 1944, which meant preparing for a seder even as they were flying over enemy territory, but adverse weather conditions delayed their departure, and they eventually parachuted into Croatia a week later, on 13 April, dropping into an area generally under the control of Tito's communist partisans.

They met up with, and attached themselves to, the partisan army's 6th Corps in the Papuk Mountains. The German occupation of Hungary forced changes in their plan, rendering the task of infiltration and carrying out their work even more hazardous. In the meantime the two groups were united on 6 May. They spent some time with the partisans, engaging in guerilla warfare, sabotage activities and the securing of escape lines for Allied airmen, while worrying that they were unable to implement the real purpose of their mission, helping Jews escape the harrying plight they were being subjected to in Hungary. Hannah Szenes was particularly disturbed by news leaking out from Hungary, and, together with Reuven Dafni, snuck over the border in late May, (Note: There is a source conflict here:(a)'Szenes crossed from Yugoslavias to Hungary at the end of May'; (b) 'On 9 June, accompanied by a French partisan who had escaped from Hungary and agreed to return with her, Szenes crossed the border on her way to Budapest and was immediately captured by the Hungarian security services.') having prearranged with Palgi to meet up either before the Dohány Street Synagogue or, failing that, the city's main cathedral. Eventually Palgi and Goldstein managed to cross over into Hungary via the Drava River with the assistance of smugglers, on 19 June, some ten days after Szenes' capture and unaware of her fate.

== Inside Hungary ==
Almost from the onset of their venturing inside Hungary, Palgi and Goldstein fell under close surveillance by Hungarian counterintelligence, which had a plant within the community. On reaching Budapest they met with leaders of the Aid and Rescue Committee in Budapest, such as Rudolf Kasztner, who at the time was negotiating with Adolf Eichmann to endeavor to save Jews by forging a deal to exchange them for trucks. According to one account, Kasztner, aware of Szenes's arrest, and that the Gestapo were looking for the other two, was horrified by Palgi's arrival at this delicate juncture. He had known Palgi from childhood since they had both grown up in Cluj, and advised him the best way to obtain immunity was to turn himself into the Gestapo and inform them he was acting on behalf of the Jewish Agency, and had come to negotiate with them to that end. Before he could do so, (Note: In her earlier article, Baumel-Schwartz wrote:'and Palgi went with (Kasztner) to the Gestapo headquarters and introduced himself as a British officer who had been sent on that mission. Even though it appeared that he had convinced the Germans, the parachutist was arrested in the end by the Hungarian secret police.') however, he was arrested, on 27 June, by the Hungarian authorities, and detained in a cell not far from where Hannah Szenes languished in prison. His companion in arms, Goldstein, remained at large for a while, though Kasztner after leading him to his parents who had been selected for the Kastner train, also persuaded him to turn himself in. Palgi was tortured to the point that he tried to commit suicide: his interrogators revived him, so that they could continue their torture to extract information he refused to divulge. He devised a means of communication with Hannah Szenes, who was locked in a cell opposite his own, by using a broken mirror to flash morse code, and thus managed to retain details of her experiences, though some details in his account, it has been suggested, may have been imaginary. He later bribed a Hungarian guard to allow him to speak with her directly.

Some hope of a respite occurred on 11 September, as Admiral Horthy was engaged in negotiating a ceasefire with the Soviets. That day, Palgi, Szenes and Goldstein, who had also been captured in the meantime, were taken from their Gestapo handlers and relocated to a Hungarian prison. On 15 October, after Horthy broadcast over national radio news of the armistice, a joint operation by Nazi Germany together with the Arrow Cross Party staged a coup d'etat, and soon after they were arraigned before a Hungarian military court, which ordered that they be sent to the Kistarcsa internment camp. En route, Palgi leapt from the train that was transporting them, and managed to make his way back to Budapest where he joined members of the pioneering Zionist underground.

After the Soviet conquest of Budapest, Palgi went to Cluj to see if he could find his parents and relatives, but it was too late. He did manage to arrange for Hannah Szenes' mother to be secreted out and settled in Palestine.

== Post-war ==
Palgi returned home in 1945. Together with the other survivor, Haim Hermesh, he was burdened by a gnawing sense of pain and guilt for having the luck to survive while his comrades had fallen. The following year, he published a memoir of the events, entitled Ruach Gedolah ba'ah (The Great Wind Came). (Note: Ruach Gedolah ba'ah, Ha'Kibbutz Ha'Meuchad, Tel Aviv,1946. The work was translated by his widow Phyllis, Into the Inferno:The Memoir of a Jewish Paratrooper Behind Nazi Lines, Rutgers University Press, 2011. Ha'Kibbutz Ha'Meuchad was a left-wing faction within the kibbutz movement.) In this memoir, which, in recording the circumstances in which so many died he considered part of his war duty, (Note: 'No, my duty is not over yet. It will never be over. Because they cannot be forgotten –neither the dead nor the living.') he expresses his shock by an impression he received on returning to his community, writing, "Everywhere I turned, the question was fired at me: Why did the Jews not rebel? Why did they go like lambs to the slaughter? Suddenly I realized that we were ashamed of those who were tortured, shot burned. There is a kind of general agreement that the Holocaust dead were worthless people. unconsciously, we have accepted the Nazi view that the Jews were subhuman."

== Later life ==
In February 1948, on the eve of the Arab-Israeli War, Palgi, accompanied by Boris Senior, was dispatched by the Haganah on a mission to South Africa to buy aircraft for the fledgling Yishuv fleet Sherut Ha'avir, forerunner of what was to become, within months, the Israeli Air Force. The mission also involved hiring maintenance crews to service them. A deal to import 50 P-40 Kittyhawks had to be scrapped because obstacles to getting them back into Palestine were insurmountable but Palgi did succeed in acquiring two DH-89 Rapides, one Anson, three Fairchild Arguses, two Beechcraft Bonanzas and five Dakotas, and managed to ferry the fleet back into Palestine just before both the independent state of Israel was declared and war broke out.

In 1954, an event on the occasion of the 10th anniversary of the parachutists' wartime activities was organized at Ma'agan. Tragically, 20 people associated with the organization of the operation, including 4 parachutists who had survived these ordeals, died when their plane crashed en route to the kibbutz.

Palgi was called as a witness in 1954-1955 when Kasztner was arraigned on charges of collaborating with the Nazis. He was cross-examined by Shmuel Tamir, and his hero's image was tarnished as he struggled, stuttering, to explain the apparent contradictions between his post-war book on the events, and his recollections in the testimony he deposed. When asked which version was correct -'What is the truth?', he replied, 'I wrote a novel, not a history,' and thereby effectively undermined the credibility and reliability of his account of what actually had taken place. Later, he charged that he had censured himself for fear of the British in 1946. The book underwent revisions for a second edition issued 2 decades later, a year before his death. In this reworking, he corrected those parts he said he had censored for the version written while the British were still the authorities in Mandatory Palestine. The variations have left historians uncertain of what precisely happened regarding a number of key events in his narrative.

Palgi was a co-founder of El Al and its deputy director from 1949 until 1960. As director of operations of the national airline, he was also on board the Bristol Britannia turboprop plane which made the first El Al non-stop flight between the United States and Israel in December 1957. Subsequently, he was Israel's director of civil aviation until 1964, when he was appointed ambassador to Tanzania. On the termination of his posting in 1966, Palgi joined the board of the Histadrut Sick Fund, where he was active until 1978.

== Sources ==
- Baumel, Judith Tydor (13 June 2003). "What Did Really Happen in Hungary? Review of "Into the Inferno: The Memoir of a Jewish Paratrooper Behind Nazi Lines" by Yoel Palgi, Rutgers University Press". University of Wisconsin Press. Archived from the original on 7 February 2016.
- Baumel-Schwartz, Judith Tydor (2010). Perfect Heroes: The World War II Parachutists and the Making of Israeli Collective Memory. University of Wisconsin Press. ISBN 9780299234836.
- Bogdanor, Paul (2016). Kasztners Crime. Transaction Publishers. ISBN 978-0-845-34834-5.
- "El Al Plane Makes First Non-stop Flight Between U.S. and Israel". Jewish Telegraphic Agency. 23 December 1957.
- Ettinger, Amos (1992). Blind Jump: The Story of Shaike Dan. Associated University Presses. ISBN 978-0-845-34834-5.
- "Events log: Planes from South Africa". Israeli Air Force.
- Gur, David (2007). Netser, Eli (ed.). Brothers for resistance and rescue: the underground Zionist youth movement in Hungary during World War II. Gefen Publishing House. ISBN 978-9-652-29386-2.
- Histadrut ha-kelalit shel ha-'ovdim ha-'Ivrim be-Erets-Yiśraʼel. Histadrut. 1951.
- Jacobson, David C. (1997). Israeli Poetry and the Bible. Wayne State University Press. ISBN 978-0-814-32623-7.
- "Joel ( Nussbecher Emil ) Palgi". Organization of Partisans Underground Fighters and Ghetto Rebels in Israel. 2010. Archived from the original on 11 September 2014.
- Laor, Dan (2007). "How Are We Expected to Remember the Holocaust? Szenes versus Kasztner". In Mendels, Doron (ed.). On Memory: An Interdisciplinary Approach. Peter Lang. pp. 195–213. ISBN 978-3-039-11064-3.
- Lowe, Keith (2017). The Fear and the Freedom: How the Second World War Changed Us. St. Martin's Press. ISBN 978-1-466-84229-8.
- Orr, Akiva (1994). Israel: politics, myths, and identity crises. Pluto Press. ISBN 978-0-745-30766-4.
- Palgi, Yoel (1984). "Yoel Palgi Tells of the Death of Hannah Szenes (1944)". In Soshuk, Levi; Eisenberg, Azriel Louis (eds.). Momentous Century: Personal and Eyewitness Accounts of the Rise of the Jewish Homeland and State, 1875-1978. Associated University Presses. pp. 216–221. ISBN 978-0-845-34748-5.
- Porat, Dina (1990). The Blue and the Yellow Stars of David: The Zionist Leadership in Palestine and the Holocaust, 1939-1945. Harvard University Press. ISBN 978-0-674-07708-9.
- Porat, Dina (2008). Israel society, the Holocaust and its survivors. Vallentine Mitchell. ISBN 978-0-853-03741-5.
- Ring, Jennifer (2012). The Political Consequences of Thinking: Gender and Judaism in the Work of Hannah Arendt. SUNY Press. ISBN 978-1-438-41739-4.
- Segev, Tom (2000). The Seventh Million: The Israelis and the Holocaust. Henry Holt. ISBN 978-0-805-06660-9.
- Van Dyke, Donald L. (2009). Fortune Favours the Bold: An African Aviation Odyssey. Xlibris Corporation. ISBN 978-1-462-81390-2.
- Vargo, Marc E. (2012). Women of the Resistance: Eight Who Defied the Third Reich. McFarland. ISBN 978-0-786-46579-8.
