= Sara Braverman =

- שרה ברברמן
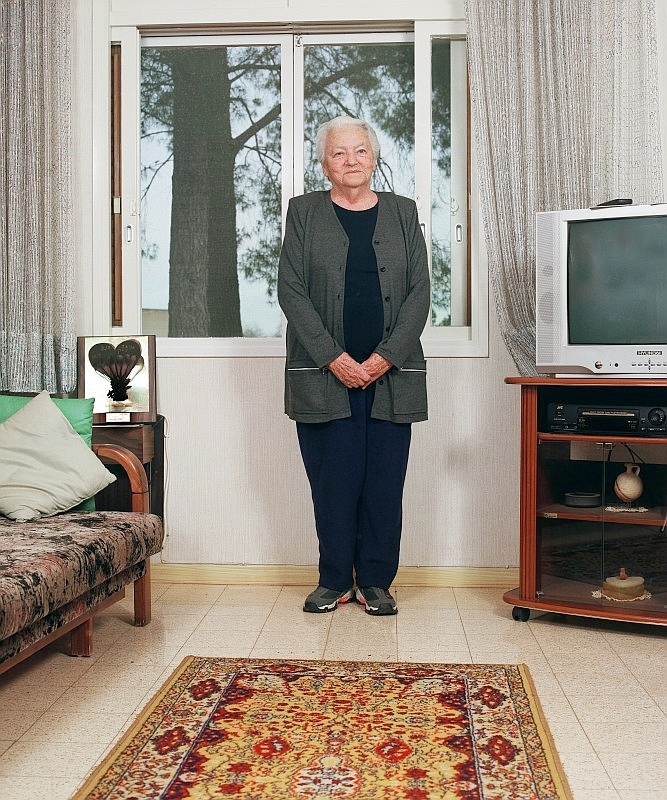
- Born: 1918; Botoșani, Romania
- Died: 10 February 2013 (aged 94–95)

Sara Braverman (Hebrew: שרה ברברמן; 1918 – 10 February 2013) was a member of the Jewish Parachutists of Mandate Palestine. She was one of the first female fighters to serve in the Palmach and a founding member of the IDF Women's Corps.

== Biography ==
Sara (Surika) Braverman was born in Botoșani, Romania to a Jewish family. As a 9 years old girl, she joined Hashomer Hatzair and immigrated to Mandatory Palestine in 1938 and started Agricultural training. She was a member of Kibbutz Shamir.

== Military career ==
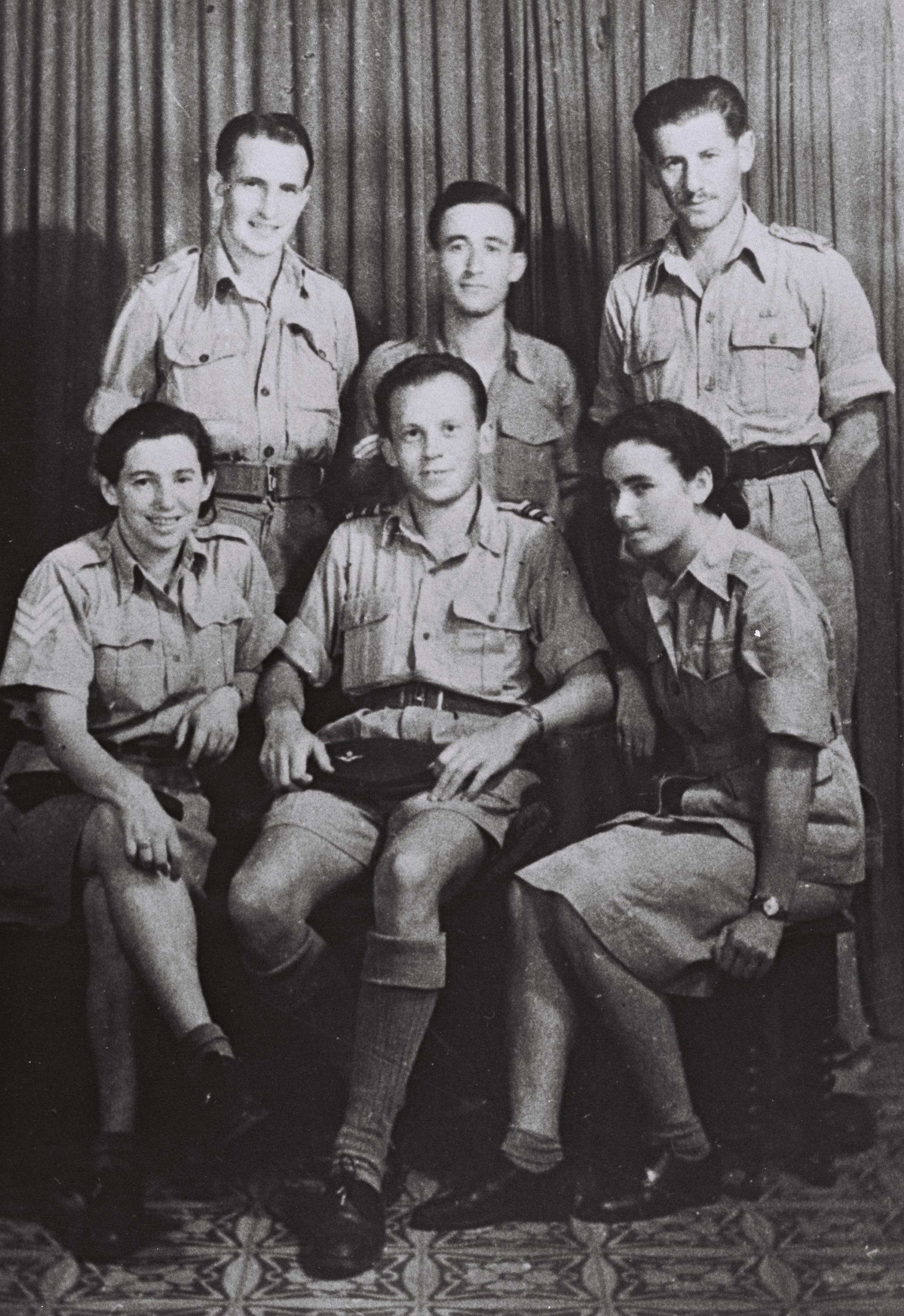
Braverman with other Jewish Paratroopers; from right to left, top row: Reuven Dafni, Zadok Doron, Abba Berdichev. Bottom row: Braverman, Arieh Fichman, Haviva Reik

Braverman was one of 37 Palestinian Jewish parachutists sent by the Jewish Agency and Britain's Special Operations Executive (SOE) on military missions in Nazi-occupied Europe.

== Awards and recognition ==
She was honored with lighting a torch on Israel's 62nd independence day in 2010, for her bravery in helping Jews during World War II.

== See also ==
- Jewish Parachutists of Mandate Palestine
- Women of Israel
