= A Walk to Caesarea =

Hebrew poem and song

- by Hannah Szenes
- Original title: הליכה לקיסריה
- Written: 1942
- Language: Hebrew

"A Walk to Caesarea" (Hebrew: הליכה לקיסריה, romanized: Halikha LeKesarya), also commonly known by the opening words "Eli, Eli" (Hebrew: אֵלִי, אֵלִי, "My God, My God") in the song version, is a poem in Hebrew written in 1942 by Hungarian Jewish World War II resistance fighter Hannah Szenes (17 July 1921 – 7 November 1944). Israeli composer David Zehavi set the poem to music in 1945. Szenes wrote the poem while residing in kibbutz Sdot Yam which is located a short distance along the Mediterranean coast from the ancient port town of Caesarea.

The song is considered one of Israel's unofficial anthems, and is the most-commonly played song on Yom HaShoah (the Holocaust Remembrance Day) in Israel.

The following is an English translation of the song version and the original Hebrew:

My God, my God,
may it never end –
the sand and the sea,
the rustle of the water,
the lightning of the sky,
the prayer of man.

אלי, אלי,
שלא יגמר לעולם
החול והים
רשרוש של המים
ברק השמים
תפילת האדם
