= Operation Wasteland =

Undercover investigation into organized crime

- Location: New York City, United States
- Organised by: Law enforcement
- Charges: price-fixing; bid rigging; waste hauling

Operation Wasteland was an undercover investigation into organized crime rings that controlled New York City's waste disposal industry from the 1950s until 1995. The investigation resulted in the indictment and conviction of more than one hundred participants in price-fixing and bid rigging of waste hauling contracts in the city.

The story is detailed in the 2002 book Takedown, the Fall of the Last Mafia Empire by Douglas Century and the former New York Police detective Rick Cowan who went undercover for three years to investigate the cartel of trash and recycling services. Cowan pretended to be Dan Benedetto, head of a paper recycling firm to investigate what the book describes as "multi-million-dollar-per-year dynasties that these guys had always expected their grandsons and great-grandsons would inherit." After the cartel's fall in 1995, some businesses in the city reportedly paid as much as 90 percent less for solid waste services. Operation Wasteland is also covered in the 2005 book Gone Tomorrow: The Hidden Life of Garbage by Heather Rogers.
