= Haviva Reik =

Jewish resistance fighter in World War II (1914–1944)

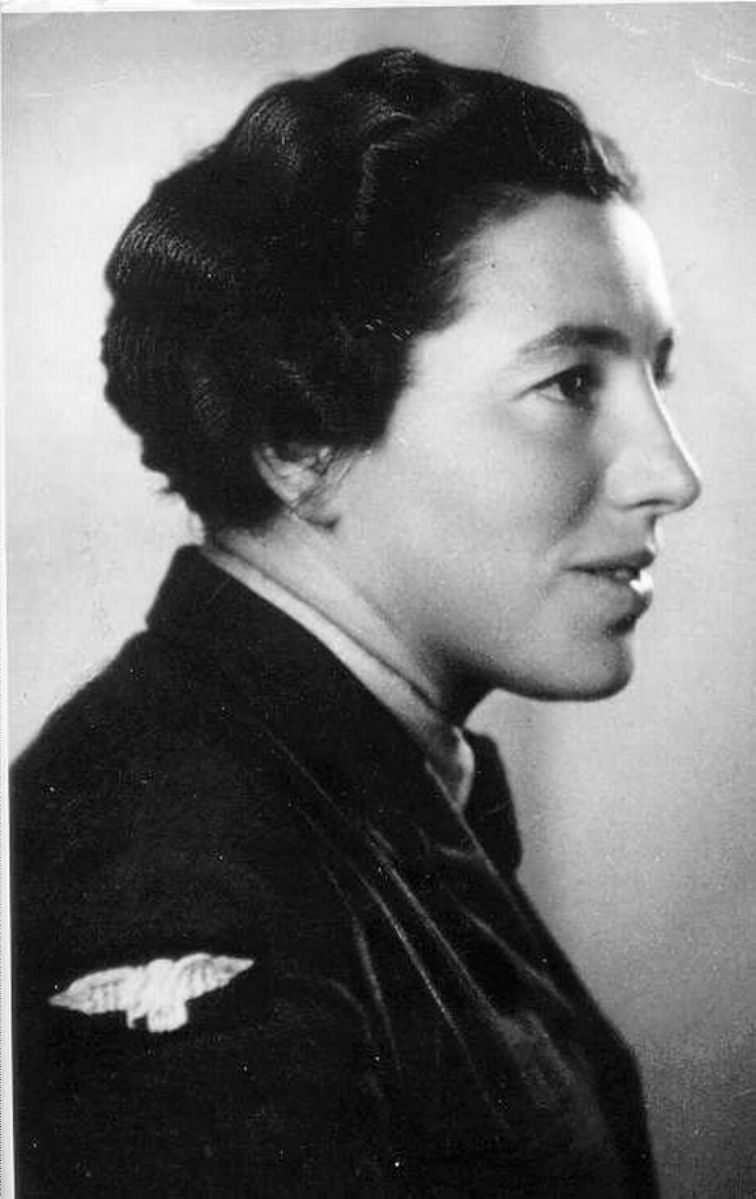
- Born: Marta Reick; 22 June 1914; Nadabula (now a part of Rožňava), Slovakia
- Died: 20 November 1944 (aged 30); Kremnička (near Banská Bystrica), Slovakia
- Military career
- Allegiance: United Kingdom
- Branch: WAAF
- Service years: 1942 – 1944
- Rank: Sergeant
- Service number: 2992503
- Unit: MI9
- Conflicts: World War II

Haviva Reik (alternately Haviva Reick, Havivah Reich, Chaviva Reiková or Chaviva Reich) (22 June 1914 – 20 November 1944) was one of 32 or 33 parachutists sent by the Jewish Agency and Britain's MI9 on military missions in Nazi-occupied Europe. Reik went to Slovakia in fall 1944 and worked with local Jewish people to resist the German occupation there. She established a camp for Russian prisoners of war who had escaped, and helped organize a Jewish resistance unit. The Germans organized forces to put down the Jewish resistance, and Reik and the other parachutists escaped with about 40 local Jews into the mountains. In November 1944, however, Reik and the other parachutists were captured, killed, and buried in a mass grave.

== Biography ==
Marta (Haviva) Reick was born to a Jewish family in the Slovakian village of Nadabula (now a part of Rožňava), and grew up in Banská Bystrica in the Carpathian Mountains. She joined the Hashomer Hatzair youth movement there. In 1939, she made aliyah to Mandatory Palestine where she joined kibbutz Ma'anit and later enlisted in the Palmach, the elite strike force of the Haganah underground military organization.

In 1942, the Jewish Agency Defense Department formed a plan to send Jews from Palestine to act as agents in Nazi-controlled territories and work with Jewish communities there. The British needed people who spoke the languages of the occupied countries and were familiar with the land and culture. The British Special Operations Executive (SOE) asked the Palmach if they could supply people with the right qualities for special operations and with a prior knowledge of Central Europe. The call was open to women as well as men; Reik was one of those accepted. She joined the Women's Auxiliary Air Force (WAAF), serving as 2992503 ACW.2 "Ada Robinson". She then joined SOE for specialist training, including a parachuting course. She was promoted to Sergeant. Reik was married but separated; her name on her British documents was listed as Martha Martinovich.

=== Operation in Slovakia ===
The mission, parachuting into Nazi-controlled territory, was highly secret and extremely dangerous; before the operation Reik told friends that she was not sure she would ever return.

An uprising was in progress at the time in her native Slovakia against the Axis-installed Hlinkova Slovenská Ľudová Strana (Slovak People's Party of Hlinka; HSLS). Centered around the Banská Bystrica region, the revolt had begun in the spring of 1944, initiated by the Czechoslovak Agrarian party, part of the Social Democratic party, the Communist party, sectors of the Slovak nationalists, and army officers. In late December 1943 these groups had aligned with the Slovak National Council. The uprising sought to overthrow the German collaborationist government and detach Slovakia from the Axis.

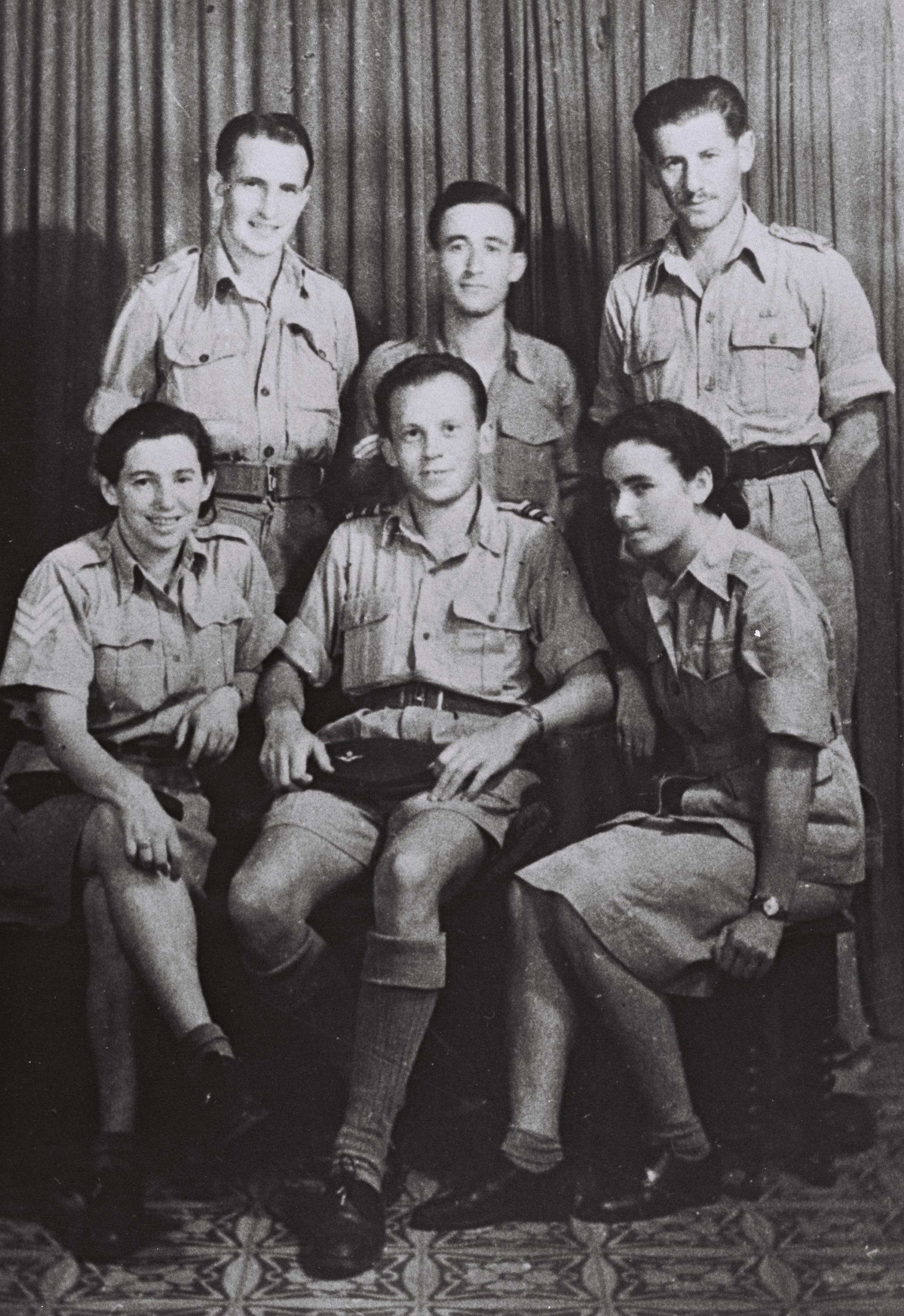
Reik with other Jewish Paratroopers; from right to left, top row: Reuven Dafni, Zadok Doron, Abba Berdichev. Bottom row: Sara Braverman, Arieh Fichman, Haviva Reik

There were armed underground Jewish cells in each of the three Slovak labor camps before the SNR was established. Early in 1944 they established contact with the SNR, and became part of the movement. The uprising was to coincide with Allied advances, particularly that of the Soviet Army. However, the Red Army held back. The partisans made considerable gains, and on August 28 the Nazis decided to occupy Slovakia and eliminate the uprising.

Reik and the other members of her group received training in parachuting in Palestine. The first time she was to jump from an airplane, she had an injured hand from earlier training, and her trainers were concerned it might not be strong enough to manage the parachute; however she did make the jump with little apparent concern. After their training, Reik and her group were transported to Cairo to await departure for the mission.

On the night of 14 September 1944, Rafi Reiss, Zvi Ben-Yaakov, and Haim Hermesh, parachuted into Slovakia; the jump was dubbed "Operation Amsterdam". Reik had planned to join the jump but British authorities refused to allow her to—they knew the Germans had copies of their standing orders prohibiting female soldiers to cross enemy lines, so they thought if she were captured she would almost certainly be executed as a spy rather than taken prisoner as a soldier. Haim Hermesh later remembered that Reik burst into tears and said, "what will become of me? ... We promised that all four of us would go together!"

The three male parachutists landed safely and made their way in a few days to Banská Bystrica—and were surprised to find Reik already there waiting for them, working with the local Jews. Four days after they had jumped, Reik had joined a group of American and British officers who were landing in Slovakia in what was called Operation Leadburn. At the end of the month, a fifth parachutist, Abba Berdiczew, joined them, bringing radio equipment.

In Banská Bystrica, Haviva and the others engaged in relief and rescue activities. Reik helped organize various Jewish groups into a resistance, settling disputes among them and lending financial and other assistance. They also aimed to help Jews escape to Palestine. The group organized a soup kitchen and community centre for refugees, and facilitated the escape of Jewish children to Hungary and from there to Palestine. Through their connections with partisan and resistance groups, they helped rescue allied airmen who had been shot down.

=== Capture ===
The Germans organized large numbers of soldiers to put down the Jewish resistance. Late in September, SS Obergruppenfuhrer Gottlob Berger, the chief commander of the German forces, was replaced by the Obergruppenfuhrer of the Hoherer SS and the Polizeifuhrer SS, Hermann Hofle. They used Ukrainian Waffen SS troops, among them apparently John (Ivan) Demjanjuk, to suppress the rebellion. On 23 October 1944, the Germans were advancing, and Reik's group decided to escape Banská Bystrica for the village of Pohronský Bukovec.

Haviva and the other parachutists escaped with about 40 Jews of varying ages from the area and built a camp in the mountains. The Germans overran the camp and captured Reik, Reiss, and Ben-Yaakov.

Reik and Reiss were killed on 20 November in the village of Kremnička near Banská Bystrica, as part of the Kremnička massacre. They were buried in a mass grave in the village. Abba Berdiczew was deported to the Mauthausen-Gusen concentration camp and later killed. Haim Hermesh escaped, fought with the partisans and the Red Army, and later returned to Palestine.

== Commemoration ==
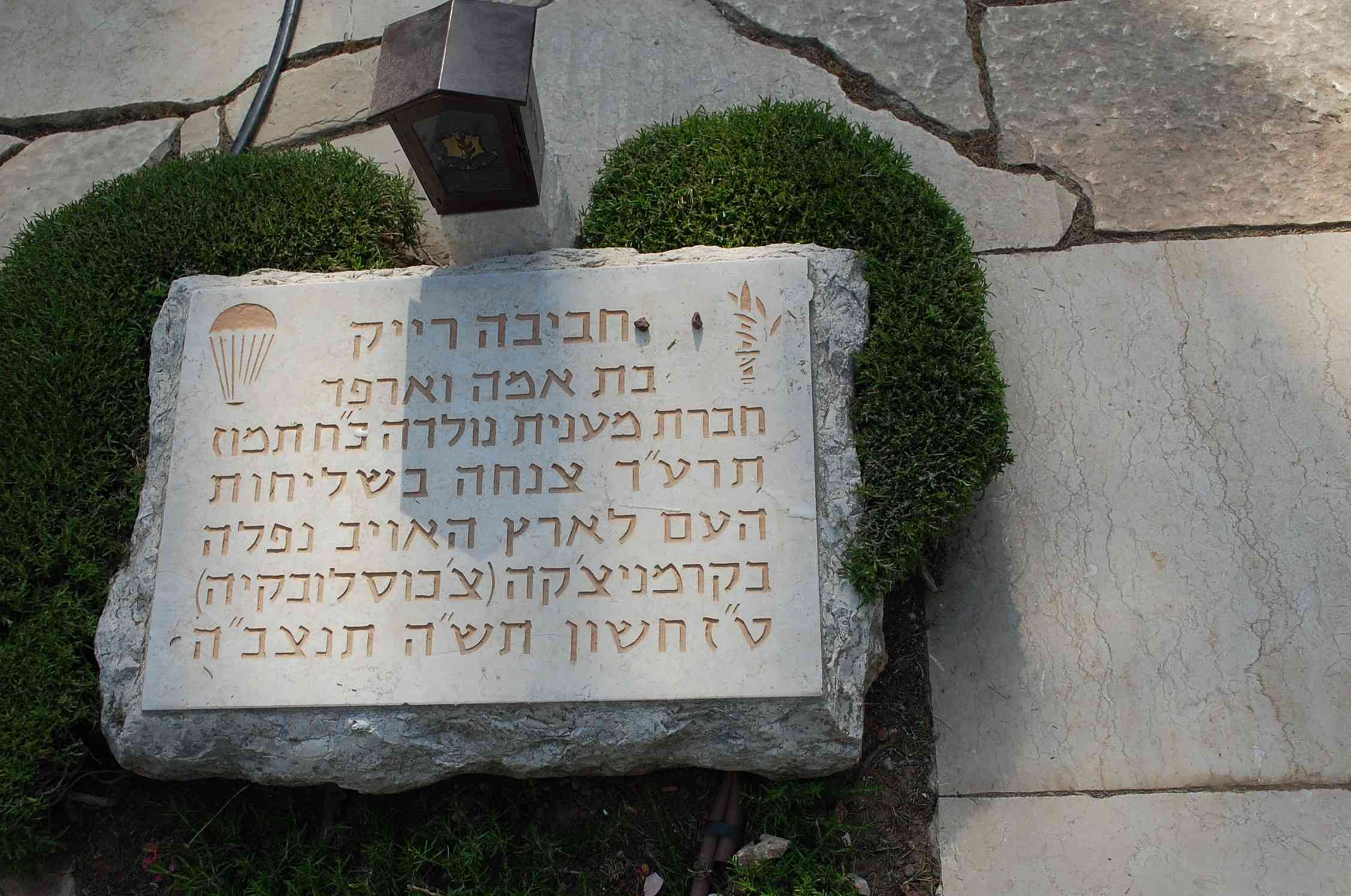
Tombstone of Haviva Reik

After the war, in September 1945, Reik's and Reiss' bodies were exhumed and buried in the Military Cemetery in Prague. On 10 September 1952, Haviva Reik's remains were buried in Mount Herzl military cemetery in Jerusalem, along with those of Szenes and Reiss. Kibbutz Lehavot Haviva, the Givat Haviva institute, a small river, a gerbera flower, a big water reservoir, an Aliyah Bet ship, and numerous streets in Israel are named after her.

== See also ==
- Jewish Parachutists of Mandate Palestine
- Hannah Szenes

== Bibliography ==
- Baumel-Schwartz, Judith Tydor (15 June 2010). Perfect Heroes: The World War II Parachutists and the Making of Israeli Collective Memory. University of Wisconsin Press. ISBN 978-0-299-23484-3.
- Brayer, Menachem M. (1986). The Jewish Woman in Rabbinic Literature: A Psychohistorical Perspective. KTAV Publishing House, Inc. ISBN 978-0-88125-072-5.
- Friling, Tuvia (2005). Arrows in the Dark (Volumes 1 and 2): David Ben-Gurion, the Yishuv Leadership, and Rescue Attempts During the Holocaust. University of Wisconsin Press. ISBN 978-0-299-17550-4.
- Gilbert, Martin (1 June 2004). The Second World War: A Complete History. Macmillan. ISBN 978-0-8050-7623-3.
- Laqueur, Walter (2001). The Holocaust Encyclopedia. Yale University Press. ISBN 978-0-300-08432-0.
- Ofer, Tehila; Ofer, Zeev (2014). Haviva Reick – A Kibbutz Pioneer's Mission and Fall behind Nazi Lines. Fawns. ISBN 978-965-555-765-7.
- Sachar, Howard M. (9 August 2005). A History of the Jews in the Modern World. Random House Digital, Inc. ISBN 978-0-375-41497-8.
- Rohrlich, Ruby (1 October 1998). Resisting the Holocaust. Berg. ISBN 978-1-85973-216-8.
- Yahil, Leni (17 October 1991). The Holocaust: The Fate of European Jewry, 1932-1945. Oxford University Press. ISBN 978-0-19-504523-9.
