= Jewish Parachutists of Mandate Palestine =

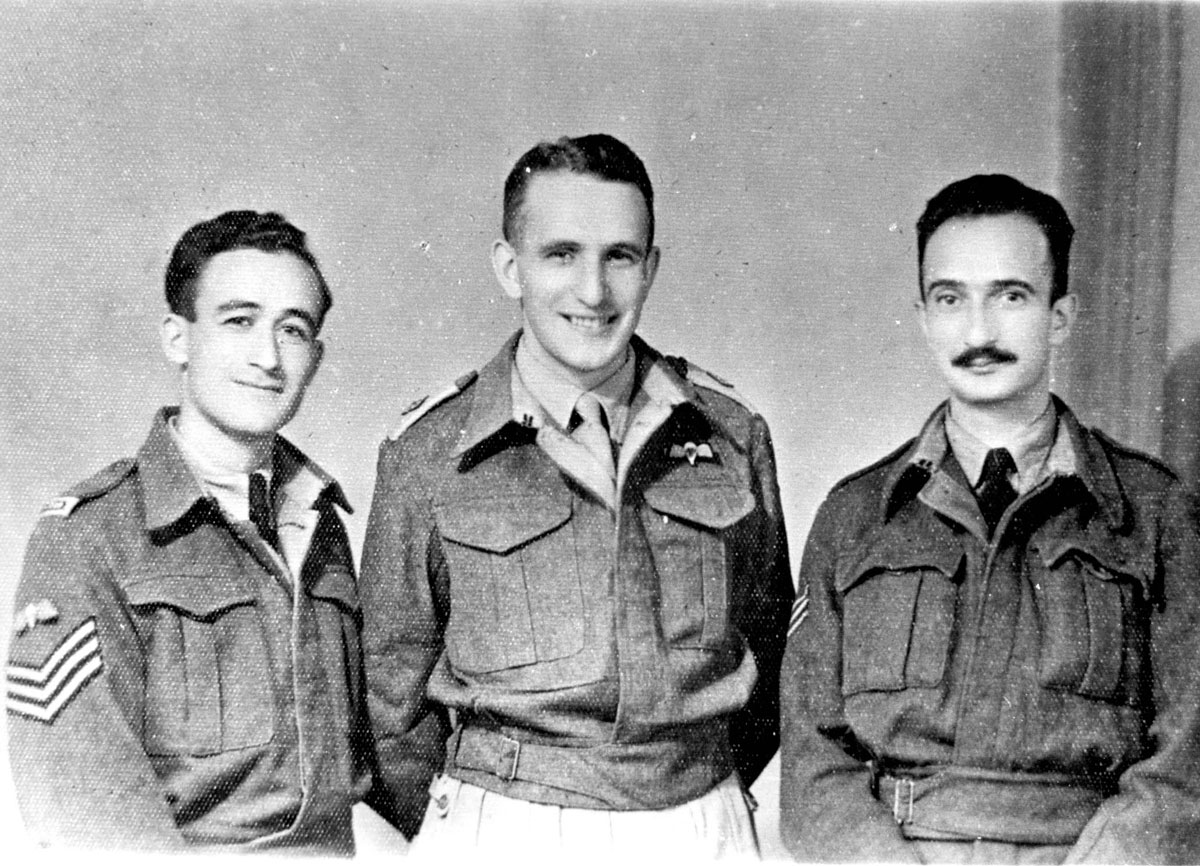
- Jewish Parachutists of Mandate Palestine in Italy, October 1944. From left to right - Zadok Doron, Aba Berdichev and Chaim Ya'ari
- Active: 1943–1945
- Country: Mandatory Palestine
- Allegiance: (United Kingdom) British Army
- Type: Parachutists
- Role: Special operations
- Size: 250 volunteers
- Engagements: World War II

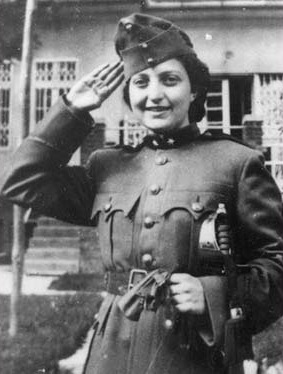
Hannah Szenes in a Hungarian army uniform as a Purim costume

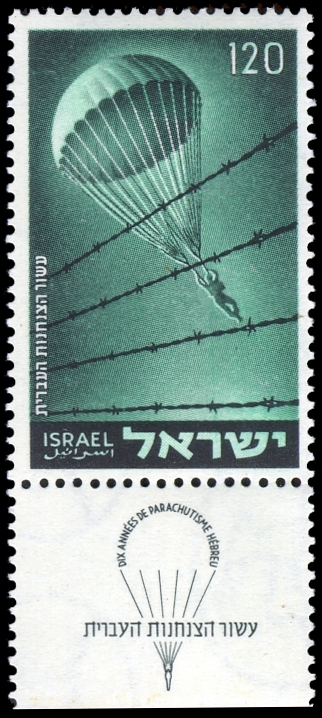
Postal stamp commemorating Jewish parachutists

The Jewish Parachutists of Mandate Palestine were a group of 250 Jewish men and women from Mandate Palestine who volunteered for operations run by British organisations MI9 and the Special Operations Executive (SOE) which involved parachuting into German-occupied Europe between 1943 and 1945. Their mission was to organize resistance to the Germans, aid in the rescue of Allied personnel and carry out assignments set by the Jewish Agency of Palestine.

Although formally enlisted in the British Army, the volunteers were selected in coordination with the Jewish Agency. In addition to British military objectives, some missions aimed to establish contact with Jewish communities and assess possibilities for rescue operations.

== History ==
In 1942–1943, following increasing reports of the mass murder of European Jewry, leaders of the Jewish Agency and the Yishuv sought ways to assist Jewish communities under Nazi occupation and to establish contact with resistance movements. After negotiations with British authorities, a limited plan was approved allowing selected Jewish volunteers from Mandatory Palestine to enlist in the British Army and undergo training for special operations behind enemy lines.

Of the 250 original volunteers, 110 underwent training. Thirty-two eventually parachuted into Europe and five infiltrated the target countries by other routes. Most of those selected for training were emigrés from Europe, with intimate knowledge of the countries to which they would be sent. Three of the parachutists infiltrated Hungary, five participated in the Slovak National Uprising in October 1944, and six operated in northern Italy. Ten parachutists served with British liaison missions to the Yugoslav partisans. Nine parachutists operated in Romania. Two others entered Bulgaria, and one each operated in France and Austria.

The Germans captured twelve and executed seven of the 37 parachutists sent into occupied Europe. Three of those executed were captured in Slovakia. Two were captured in Hungary and one in northern Italy. After seven missions the parachutist who entered France was captured and killed.

Hannah Szenes, one of the best-known of the MI9 parachutists, was seized in German-occupied Hungary and executed in Budapest on 7 November 1944, at the age of 23. Szenes was a talented poet and her songs are still sung in Israel.

After the war, remains of three of the seven parachutists killed in the war, including Szenes, were interred on the National Military and Police cemetery in Mount Herzl cemetery in Jerusalem. Memorials for the other four are also at Mount Herzl Cemetery.

== Mount Herzl burials ==
A national burial site is located in the national military and police cemetery at Mount Herzl in Jerusalem:

- Sergeant Haviva Reik, Women's Auxiliary Air Force H.Q. and MI9. Died 20 November 1944, age 30. AKA Ada Robinson and Martha Marinovic.
- Sergeant Stephan Rafael Reisz, Royal Air Force Volunteer Reserve 159 G.H.Q. (Middle East) and SOE. Died 20 November 1944, age 30. AKA S. Rice.
- Aircraftwoman 2nd Class Hannah Szenes, Women's Auxiliary Air Force and MI9. Died 7 November 1944, age 23.

== Gallery ==
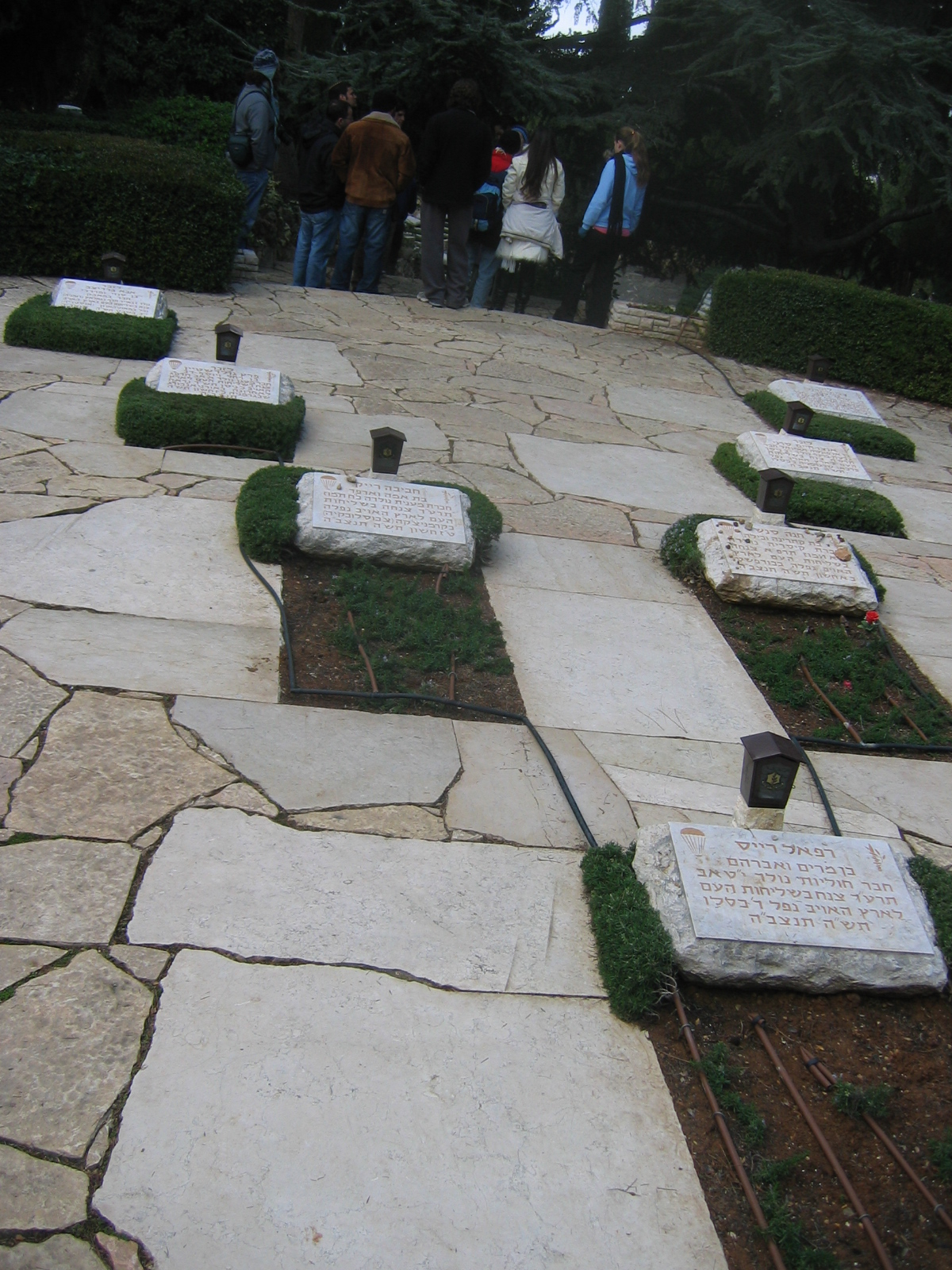
The graves of the seven Jewish Parachutists of Mandate Palestine in Mount Herzl in Jerusalem

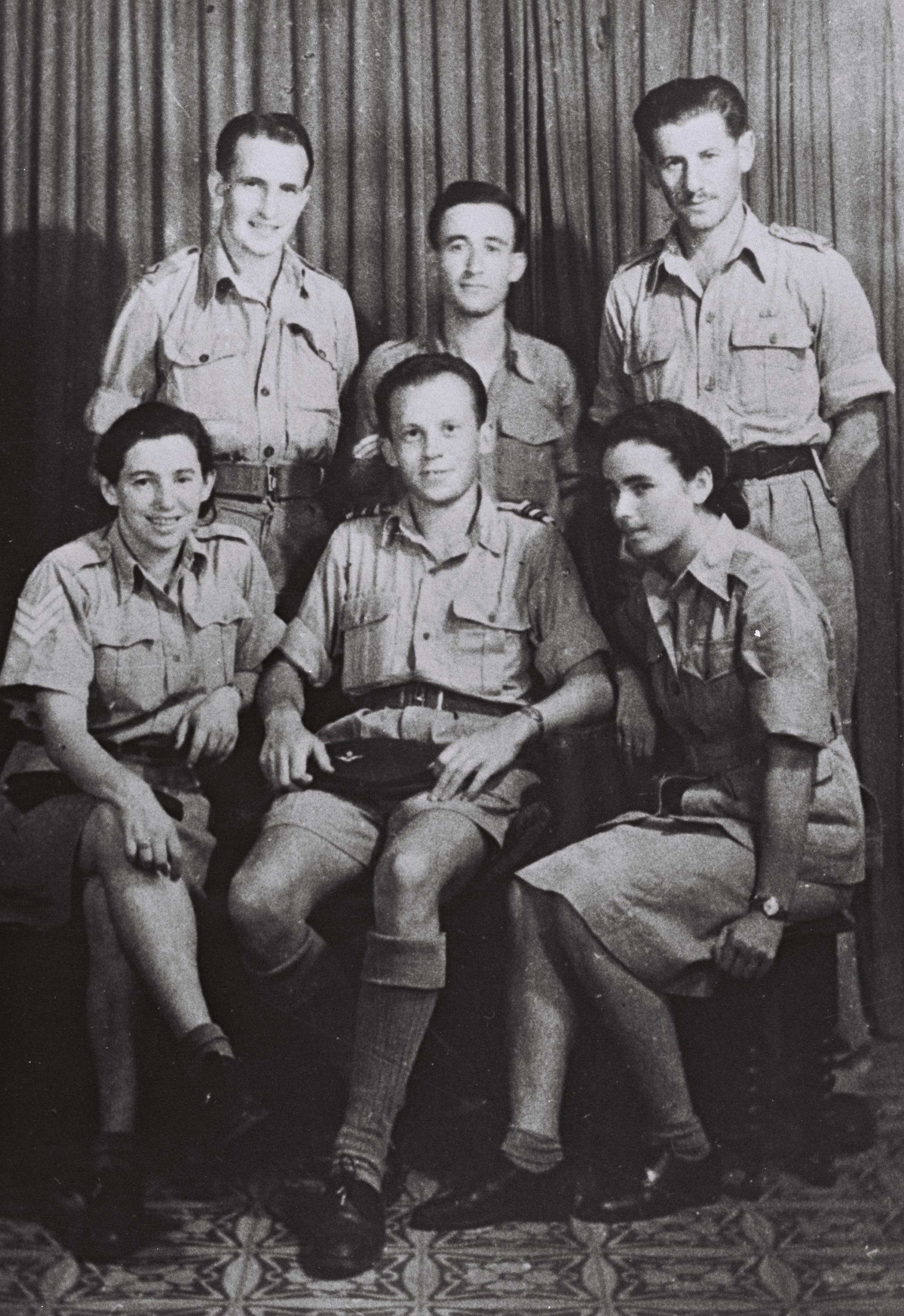
Group of Jewish paratroopers. From right to left, top row: Reuven Dafni, Zadok Doron, Abba Berdichev. Bottom row: Sara Braverman, Arieh Fichman, Haviva Reik

== Jewish Parachutists (partial list) ==
- Sara Braverman
- Reuven Dafni
- Enzo Sereni
- Dan Laner
- Shaike Dan
- Peretz Rosenberg
- Yoel Palgi
- Haviva Raik
