= Enzo Sereni =

Italian-Jewish Zionist and SOE agent (1905–1944)

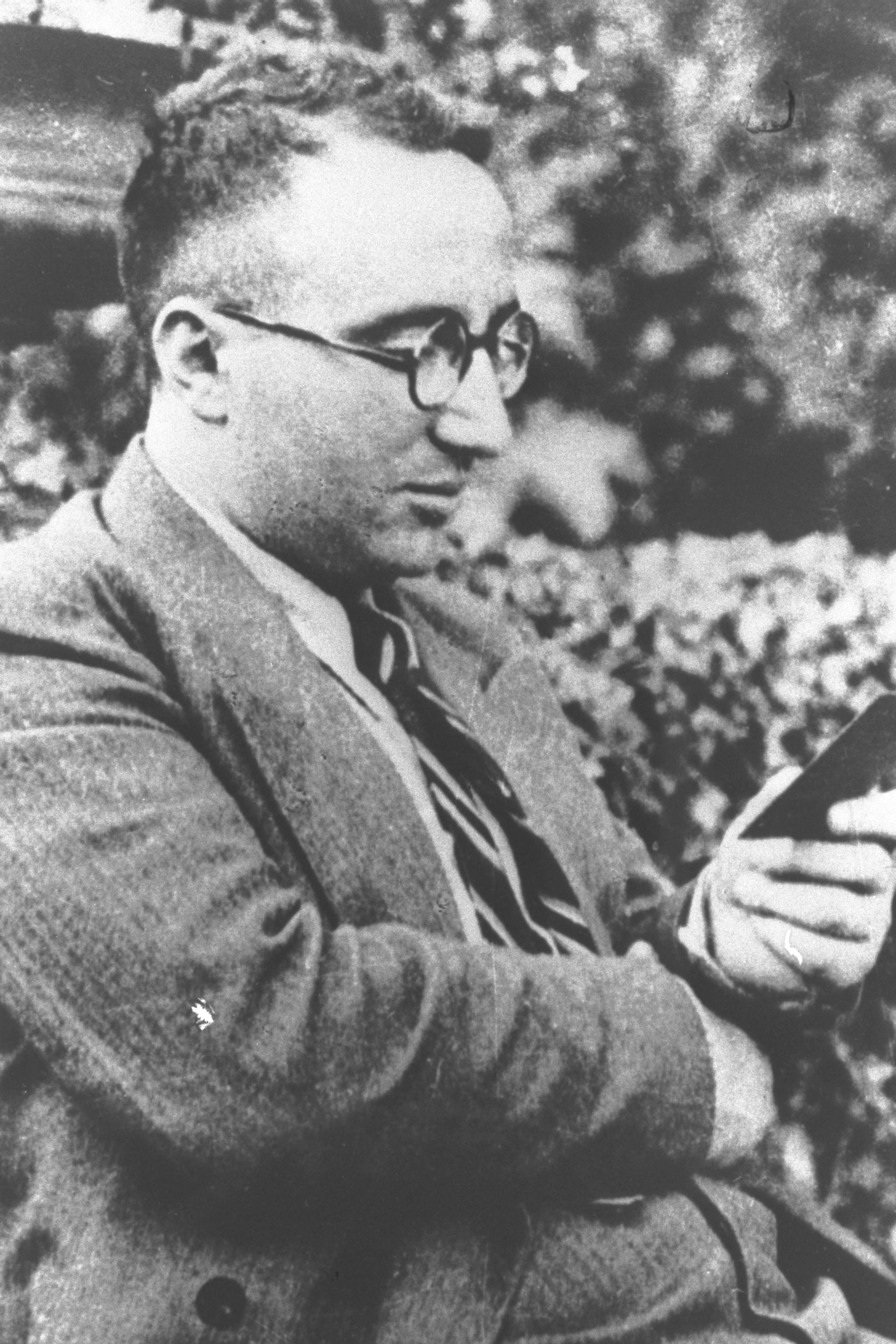
- Sereni in Potsdam, Germany in 1934
- Born: Enzo Sereni; 17 April 1905; Rome, Italy
- Died: 18 November 1944 (aged 39); Dachau concentration camp, Nazi Germany
- Occupations: Co-founder of Givat Brenner, Jewish Brigade Officer
- Known for: Captured parachuting behind enemy lines into Nazi-occupied Italy

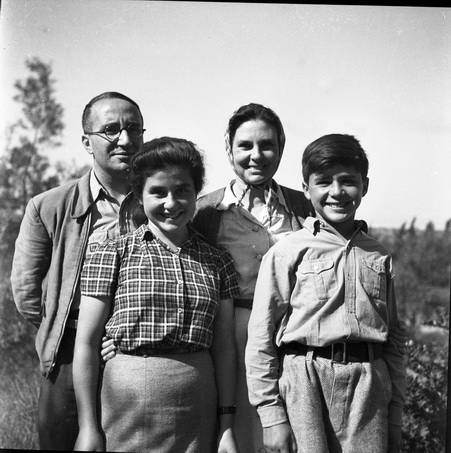
Enzo Sereni and his family photographed before his leaving for Europe

Enzo Sereni (Hebrew: אֶנְצוֹ חַיִּים סֶרֶנִי, 17 April 1905 – 18 November 1944) was an Italian Labor Zionist and one of the co-founders of kibbutz Givat Brenner. He was involved in promoting Jewish-Arab co-existence in Mandatory Palestine and served as an officer in the Jewish Brigade during World War II. In 1944, he was parachuted into Nazi-occupied Italy, where he was captured by German forces and later executed at the Dachau concentration camp.

== Early life ==
Sereni was born in Rome to an assimilated Italian Jewish family. His father was physician to the King of Italy. At the age of eighteen he attended the 13th Zionist Congress in Carlsbad (Karlovy Vary), and subsequently became a Zionist; he was one of the first Italian Zionists. He married his high school sweetheart Ada Sereni in 1926, who would continue his work after his death.

== Zionist activity ==
After obtaining his PhD in philosophy from the University of Rome, he along with his wife and infant daughter, emigrated to Mandate Palestine in 1927. He worked in orange groves in Rehovot and soon helped found kibbutz Givat Brenner. As an enthusiastic Labor Zionist, Sereni was also active in the Histadrut trade union. He was a pacifist, who advocated Jewish co-existence with the Arabs, and integration of Jewish and Arab society.

Sereni was sent to Europe in 1931–1934 to help bring people to Palestine through the Youth Aliyah, and was briefly detained by the Gestapo. He helped to organize the Hechalutz movement in Nazi Germany and was also involved in helping to smuggle money and people out of Germany. Sereni was also sent to the United States to help organize the Zionist movement there.

During World War II, he joined the British Army, and was involved in disseminating anti-fascist propaganda in Egypt. The British sent him to Iraq, and Sereni spent part of his time organizing clandestine Jewish immigration to Palestine. In 1942, Sereni became one of the first Jewish emissaries from Palestine to Iraq and visited Sandur, a Jewish village in northern Iraq and described it in detail. The village was located an hour and a half's drive from Mosul, in a valley between two walls of rock. It was completely green and "full of gardens of fruit, pears, grapes, plums, pomegranates, apples". Sereni got in trouble with his British superior officers for his Zionist views and was imprisoned briefly for forging passports.

Sereni then helped organize the Jewish parachute unit of the British Special Operations Executive (SOE) that sent agents into occupied Europe. Of about 250 volunteer trainees, about 110 were selected for training, and 33 were actually parachuted into Europe, including Sereni, despite his relatively advanced age. On 15 May 1944, he was parachuted into Northern Italy but was captured immediately. According to records, he was shot in Dachau concentration camp on 18 November 1944. Other famous martyrs who parachuted into Europe with this unit include Hannah Szenes and Haviva Reik. Kibbutz Netzer Sereni is named after him, as are many streets throughout Israel.

Sereni wrote several books and numerous articles.
