= Caesarstone =

Company for engineered stone surfaces

Caesarstone Ltd.
- Company type: Public
- Traded as: Nasdaq: CSTE
- Industry: Manufacturing
- Founded: 1987; 39 years ago
- Headquarters: Sdot Yam, Israel
- Revenue: ▼US$ 443 million (2024)
- Operating income: US$ −41.9 million (2024)
- Net income: US$ −43 million (2024)
- Number of employees: 1,532
- Website: caesarstone.com

Caesarstone Ltd. (Hebrew: אבן קיסר, Even Qeysar), is a publicly traded company that engages in the production and marketing of engineered stone surfaces used for kitchen countertops, vanity tops, flooring, wall cladding and general interior design. The company was founded in 1987 and is traded on the NASDAQ in New York (CSTE). Headquarters are located in Kibbutz Sdot Yam in Israel. Production facilities are in Israel and India with third party manufactured product sourced from factories in China. Its products are sold in approximately 50 countries around the world through a network of 6 subsidiaries and numerous distributors.

Caesarstone is recognized as one of the first companies to commercialize engineered quartz surfaces globally, introducing the concept of quartz-based composite countertops to both residential and commercial design markets and helping define the artificial stone category that later expanded worldwide.

== History ==
The Caesarstone factory commenced its operations in 1987, at Kibbutz Sdot Yam, replacing its terrazzo tile factory. The company was established in the wake of development work performed jointly by members of the kibbutz and additional parties such as Professor Moshe Narkis of the Technion. After changing the focus from sale of floor tiles to quartz surfaces and establishing itself in the domestic market, the company started to export its products to different countries around the world in the 1990s. In 2005, an additional production facility was opened at the Bar-Lev Industrial Park. In 2006, TENE Investment Fund invested 25 million dollars in exchange for 21.7% control in the company, which led to the adding of another production line at the Bar-Lev facility.

In 2008, the company began establishing subsidiaries in its main markets: Australia (2008), Canada (2010), USA and Singapore (2011) UK (2017) and Scandinavia (2023) along with activity conducted through distributors in approximately 50 countries.

In 2015–2016, Caesarstone encountered challenges which included discord between shareholders and kibbutz members, departure of board members and CEO, and a report by Spruce Point hedge fund claiming that the company's quartz surfaces contain less than the commonly accepted amounts of quartz and yet are still sold at premium prices. In 2016 the share price declined compared to its former peak, however in H1 2017, Caesarstone shares climbed 23 percent; thus, Caesarstone's value stands at 1.49 billion dollars.

In 2015, Caesarstone opened a new facility in the US with an investment of approx. 100 million dollars. The plant was built in Richmond Hill, Georgia, and provides quartz surfaces mainly to markets in North America, and other countries as well. The plant was shut down in 2024.

In 2020, Caesarstone purchased Lioli Ceramica and Omricon Granite and Tile.Lioli Ceramica, based in Morbi, India, was one of India’s most technologically advanced porcelain slab manufacturers, specializing in large-format sintered surfaces. This acquisition marked Caesarstone’s formal entry into porcelain manufacturing and positioned the company to expand beyond quartz into multi-material surface innovation. Omicron Granite & Tile, a U.S.-based distributor, expanded Caesarstone’s direct channel access in North America, reinforcing the company’s “closer to market” strategy.

As of 2024, Caesarstone operates two production facilities: a facility in Israel for engineered stone production and a site in India for porcelain surface production. The Bar Lev Israel facility shut down in 2025.

=== R&D Milestones ===
- In 2012, with the launch of the Supernatural Collection, the company was the first in the market to introduce veining technology. This innovation allowed Caesarstone to replicate the natural movement of marble veins within quartz, setting up a new design standard later adopted across the engineered stone industry, becoming a category benchmark.
- In 2017, Caesarstone introduced a collection that incorporated technology designed specifically for industrial surfaces (the Metropolitan Collection). This range introduced rough, textured finishes and concrete-inspired tones developed through proprietary surface-engineering techniques. The Metropolitan Collection is often credited with establishing the “industrial aesthetic” trend within premium surfaces, extending Caesarstone’s design leadership from polished to tactile finishes.
- In 2020, Caesarstone was the first to introduce a quartz collection for outdoor applications. Caesarstone Outdoor was engineered with advanced UV resistance, thermal stability, and weather durability, making it one of the first quartz materials certified for full exterior exposure. This expanded quartz beyond interior kitchens to outdoor living design and earned multiple design awards internationally.
- Caesarstone has also put a lot of effort into the development of low-silica surface technologies to advance sustainability. This has led to the 2023 launch of Caesarstone’s Mineral Surfaces range, a new class of low-silica surfaces designed to maintain strength and aesthetics while significantly reducing crystalline silica content. During 2025 Caesarstone introduced its Advanced Fusion (Caesarstone ICON) surfaces: the company’s first crystalline silica-free material (may contain less than 1% crystalline silica), made from a proprietary blend of recycled materials..

== Surfaces ==
Caesarstone manufactures a variety of surfaces for residential and commercial use, which are made from different materials.

=== Quartz ===
Caesarstone is a manufacturer of engineered quartz surfaces. The material is mostly natural quartz, combined with resin binders and pigments. This gives hardness, color consistency, and strength. The company has developed several product lines for different looks. Caesarstone’s quartz is known for its precision manufacturing, consistency, and long-term durability, with certifications from GREENGUARD, NSF, and ISO 14001 standards.

=== Porcelain ===
Caesarstone Porcelain is sintered/pressed ceramic surface, made by fusing natural raw materials under extreme heat and pressure. The Caesarstone Porcelain line, which is marketed under the LIOLI brand in all territories except for the United States, is claimed to be designed for diverse environments, including countertops, flooring, wall panels, backsplashes, shower surrounds, and large-format façades with heat resistance and UV stability.

=== Advanced Fusion (Caesarstone ICON) ===
Launched in 2025, Caesarstone ICON surfaces are marketed as crystalline silica-free and made from a proprietary blend that includes ~80% recycled materials – including high-quality, post-industrial glass. As of 2025, Caesarstone has transitioned 18 quartz surface colors into ICON format, while also launching collections of new colors developed specifically for this surface type.

== Financial ==
Caesarstone's operations are impacted by the performance of the home remodeling and new construction sectors of the economy. In 2023/24, Caesarstone began implementing a transition from a countertop company to a surface company, implementing a brand-centric business model.

In 2023, Caesarstone initiated significant restructuring actions aimed at revitalizing long-term growth and profitability. The company reported financial results for 2023 that included a revenue of $565.2 million, a net loss of $107.7 million, an adjusted net loss per share of $1.34, and cash flow from operations in the amount of $66.5 million.

For 2024, Caesarstone reported a revenue of $443.2 million, a net loss of $42.8 million, and a gross margin of $21.8 million.

In 2023–2024, the company restructured its operations to reduce manufacturing costs and optimize its distribution footprint, consolidating facilities in Israel while exiting direct manufacturing in the United States. The strategic transformation also introduced a global “multi-material” portfolio strategy, with porcelain, mineral, and advanced fusion (ICON) surfaces complementing quartz as part of a broader, design-led product mix.

Financial reports filed with the U.S. Securities and Exchange Commission highlight this period as a critical transition from a single-category quartz manufacturer to a diversified global surfaces brand focused on innovation, sustainability, and direct consumer engagement. Caesarstone’s filings also note intensified market competition, price pressure in North America, and growing regulatory impacts on engineered stone markets.

== ESG Leadership ==
Since 2021, Caesarstone has published an annual ESG report, which details its global-scale data, goals and goal attainment progression from 2018 until today. The key areas described are recycled materials, wastewater recovery, zero waste to landfill, improvement programs, and more.

Caesarstone’s sustainability framework is structured around three pillars: Responsible Products, Responsible Operations, and Responsible supply chain. Each is measured through quantitative KPIs tied to ISO 14001 environmental standards and the UN Sustainable Development Goals (SDGs).

The company’s 2024 ESG report outlines measurable progress, a 100% recycling rate at the Lioli production plant in India, and a 100% wastewater recycling rate at the company's production sites and key distribution centers.

The company claims that Caesarstone ICON and Mineral surfaces demonstrate commitment to sustainability.

Caesarstone maintains GREENGUARD Gold and NSF certifications across its core products.

== Nasdaq IPO ==
In February 2012, Caesarstone filed with the U.S. Securities and Exchange Commission to execute an initial public offering of up to $115 million and list its shares on the Nasdaq stock exchange. Among the companies involved in the IPO were J.P. Morgan, Barclays, Credit Suisse, and Baird. Caesarstone's 6.7 million shares began trading on the NASDAQ Global Select Market on 22 March and priced at $11 each. Caesarstone trades on NASDAQ in New York under the ticker symbol CSTE.

== 2023 Caesarstone Australian Ad Controversy ==
In late October 2023, Caesarstone launched an Australian ad campaign to oppose a ban on the product, which is linked to silicosis, a deadly lung disease. The ad claims that banning the product will harm workers and consumers. Trade unions and politicians have condemned the ad as a “disgrace” and a “misinformation” campaign, and have compared Caesarstone to James Hardie, the company notorious for its asbestos liabilities. Trade unions have also marched to the NSW Parliament to demand a ban on engineered stone. Federal and state work safety and health ministers met on Friday (27 October 2023) to discuss a secret report that reportedly recommends a ban on engineered stone, dubbed the new asbestos. Caesarstone pushed for a ban only on products with more than 40 per cent silica content.

== Australia’s Ban on Engineered Stone ==
On 1 July 2024, Australia banned the importation, supply and processing of engineered stone surfaces that contain at least 1% crystalline silica, following a campaign led by trade unions, in light of a significant increase in cases of silicosis – a preventable occupational dust-related disease - among stone fabrication workers in the country.

Like other quartz engineered stone surfaces, Caesarstone’s quartz surfaces became subject to the ban on September 1st, 2024. In alignment with the ban, Caesarstone introduced advanced mineral crystalline silica-free surfaces called ICON.

== See also ==
- Economy of Israel
- Home improvement
- List of Israeli companies
