= Ada Sereni =

Israel Prize recipient (1905–1997)

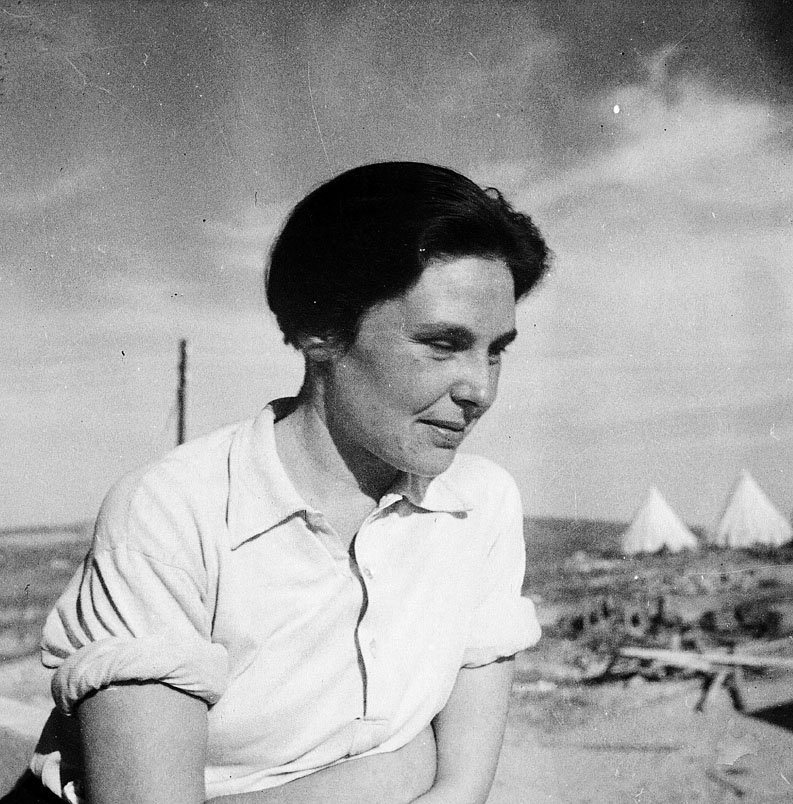
- Sereni in 1930
- Born: Ada Ascarelli; June 20, 1905; Rome, Italy
- Died: November 24, 1997 (aged 92); Jerusalem, Israel
- Occupation: Spymaster
- Known for: Head of the Mossad LeAliyah Bet in Italy
- Awards: Israel prize (1995)

Signature
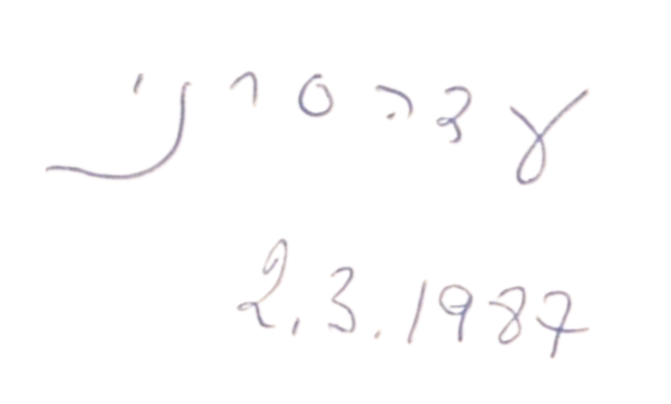

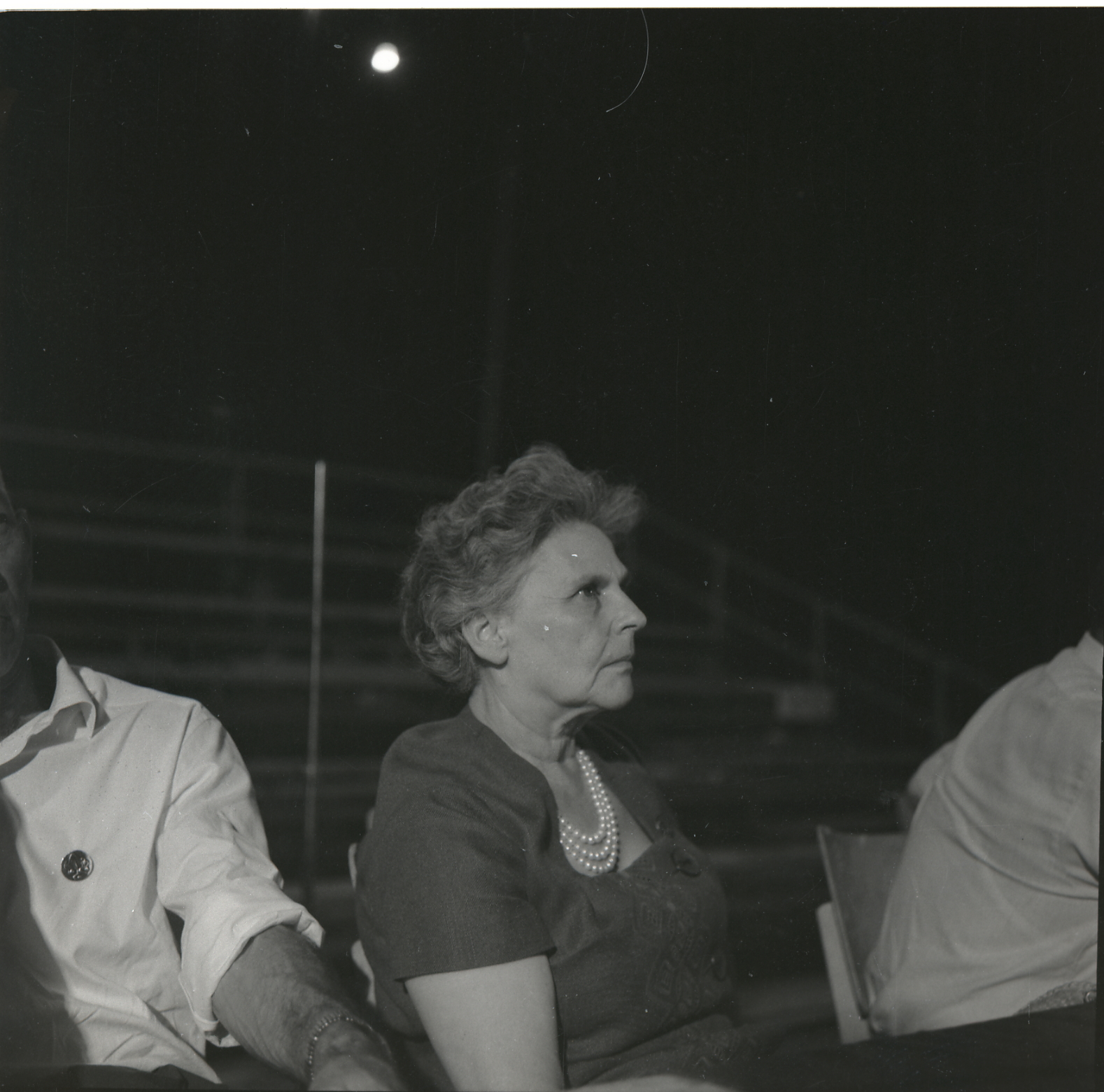
Sereni in 1962

Ada Sereni (née Ascarelli) (June 20, 1905 – November 24, 1997) was one of the heads of the Mossad LeAliyah Bet in Italy, one of the founders of Givat Brenner, and a recipient of the Israel Prize for special contribution to society and the country.

== Biography ==
=== Early years ===
Born as Ada Ascarelli in 1905 in Rome to the Ascarelli family, a wealthy Jewish Sephardic Jewish family who count Devorà Ascarelli as an ancestor. Her parents were Ettore (1847–1919), and Emma Tagliacozzo (1882–1978). Her father died when she enrolled in high school. Her mother survived the Holocaust by escaping the roundup of Italian Jews on October 16, 1943, and hiding in the convent of the nuns of Notre-Dame de Sion. Her paternal grandfather was Tranquillo Ascarelli, former president of the Israelite University. Her maternal grandfather Ariel, as the Pope's wool supplier, had never had to submit to the restrictions that kept other Roman Jews in the Jewish ghetto.

She attended T. Mamiani High School in Rome, where she met Enzo Sereni, who was already active in the Zionist movement. They got married in 1925 at the age of 20 when Enzo received a degree in philosophy from University of Rome; Ada abandons her degree in chemistry. In 1926 they announce to their families they are moving to Israel, doing so in February 1927 with their infant daughter Hannah (b. July 4, 1926), settling in Rehovot. They were among the first Italians to immigrate (make Aliyah) to Israel.

=== Move to Israel and Givat Brenner ===
Sereni found the move to Rehovot very difficult, referring to them as "the worst time in her life." While Enzo worked in the orchards, Ada stayed at home caring for their two daughters, the second daughter, Hagar (b. July 2, 1927), was born in Israel.

In June 1928, per Sereni's direction, she and her family joined the group founding Givat Brenner, one of Israel's largest Kibbutzes. Her son Daniel (b. March 8, 1931) was born there.

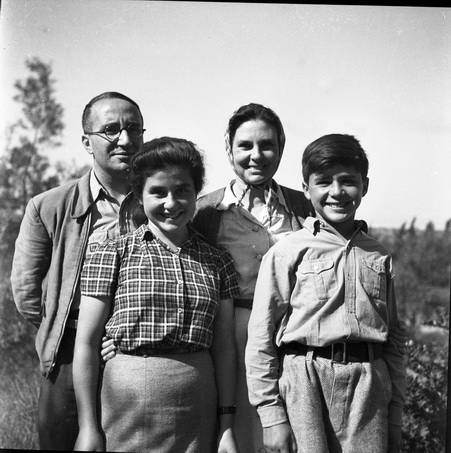
Sereni family photographed before Enzo leaves for Europe

While the Kibbutz had no infrastructure (water was carried in on donkeys), Sereni adapted well to life there. She became the director of the pomegranate juice and preserves factory. In the 1930s, the family joined Enzo on several missions on behalf of the kibbutz and the Zionist movement to Italy, Germany, and the United States. While in New York, Sereni organized a commune of young Israeli pioneers and educators, all living in the same house with their families.

In 1944, Enzo, against Sereni's wishes, volunteered to go behind enemy lines in Italy to make contact with the Jews who survived there. According to Ada:

"That was perhaps the only time I told Enzo not to pursue his choice. He was adamant."

After he was deployed on May 15, 1944, all contact with him was lost. At the end of World War II, when Enzo was not among the prisoners who returned, Sereni turned to Shaul Avigur, the head of the Mossad LeAliyah Bet, and with his approval went to Italy to attempt to trace the fate of her husband.

=== Mossad LeAliyah Bet in Italy ===
In Italy, Sereni learned through written testimony that Enzo was executed in Dachau concentration camp in November 1944.

There, Sereni met Yehuda Arazi who coordinated the activities of Mossad LeAliyah Bet and accepted Sereni into the mission. Her official mission was to establish clubs for the members of the Jewish Brigade, in reality she worked to support the Mossad's mission of facilitating then-prohibited Jewish immigration to British Palestine.

From June 1945 until the Establishment of the State of Israel in 1948, Sereni worked for the group in Italy. From 1945 to 1947 Sereni was Arazi's deputy, taking over as the head from April 1947 – until the establishment of the State of Israel in May 1948.

Sereni duties included purchasing ships ranging from fishing boats to boats able to contain thousands of passengers, organizing the supplies and influx of refugees as well as making sure they were able to survive the journey. She directly intervened in February 1946 when the ship Fede was stopped by Italian authorities, enabling the ship to leave La Spezia in Italy. She once ended up in prison.

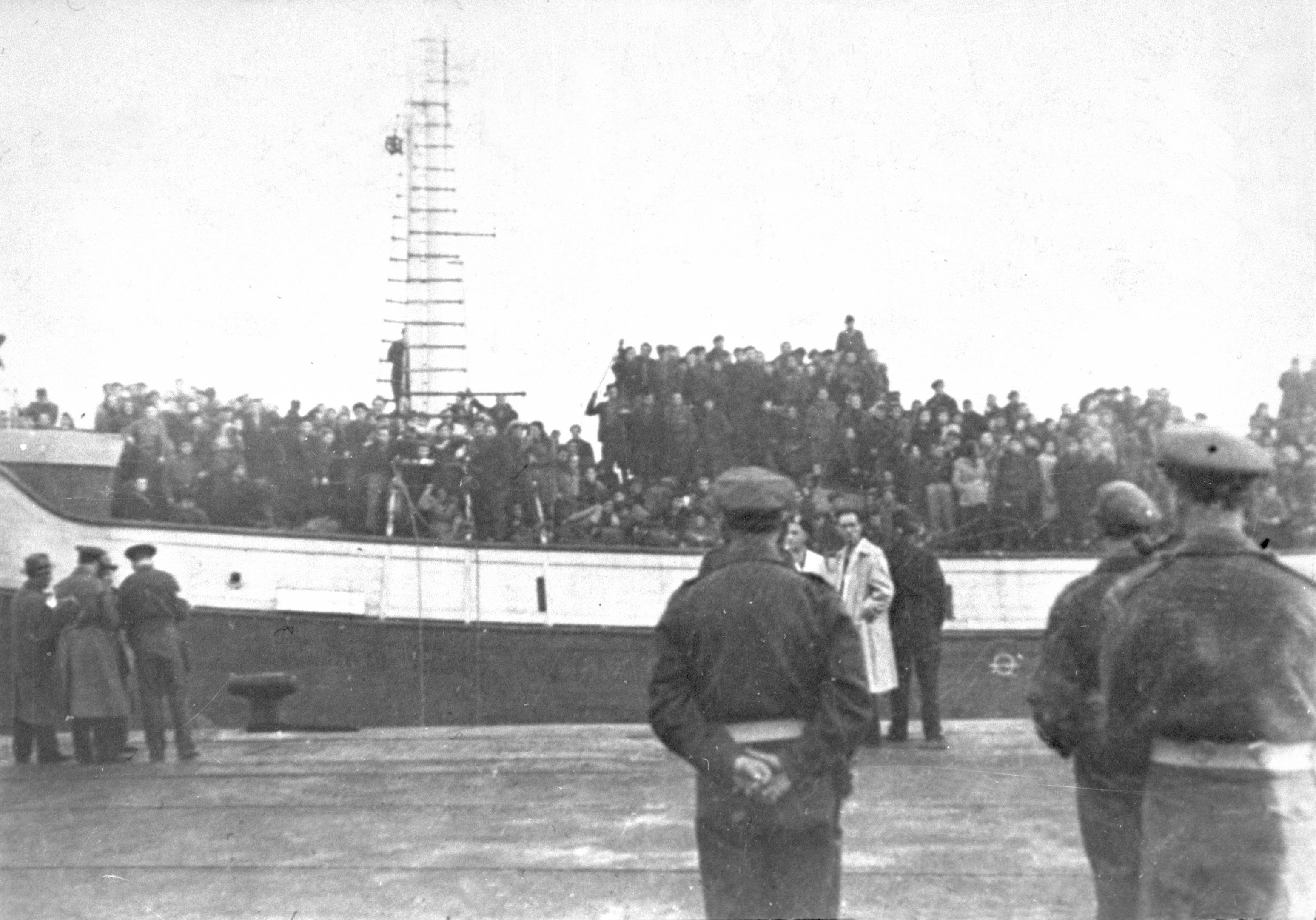
The ship Enzo Sereni

From 1945 to 1948, Sereni is credited with organizing between 33 and 38 expeditions, illicitly sending more than 25,000 Jews (some estimates say 28,000) from Italy to Israel on dozens of ships setting out from various locations along the Italian coast. One ship was named the Enzo Sereni which successfully sailed to Haifa with 551 men and 357 women, many of whom were former partisans.

In Sereni's travels across Italy, she was driven by a volunteer, Mordechai Hod, later the commander of the Israeli Air Force.

=== Establishment of the State of Israel ===
Once the State of Israel was established and Jewish immigration was openly allowed, Sereni became involved in the clandestine procurement of weapons and other warfare for Israel, as well as the Mossad's operational activity to prevent the procurement of weapons to Arab countries through Operation Robbery. In an unofficial meeting with Italian Prime Minister Alcide De Gasperi, she convinced him to grant her passive complicity for her task from the Italian authorities.

==== 1950s ====
Returning to Israel in 1950, Sereni moved to Tel Aviv, becoming active in various civil issues. With Yehuda Arazi and Maurizio Vitale, she founded the Ramat Aviv Hotel. By naming the hotel Sereni indirectly chose the name of the neighborhood Ramat Aviv as well.

In 1954, Sereni's son Daniel and his wife Ofra Sereni (née Katron), who was pregnant at the time, were killed in Ma'agan, when a plane crashed into a crowd participating in a memorial ceremony for paratroopers, like his father Enzo, who operated in Europe in World War II.

In 1958, Sereni joined Nativ, a branch of Israel's secret service focused on helping Jews from the Soviet Union immigrate to Israel. That same year, Sereni sent a letter to David Ben-Gurion, Israel's Prime Minister, requesting approval for her effort of "Judaizing the goyim." With her approval, she went on mission to Italy from 1958 to 1967 to establish a lobby among the Italian elite for the Jews of the Soviet Union. She returned to Israel in 1968.

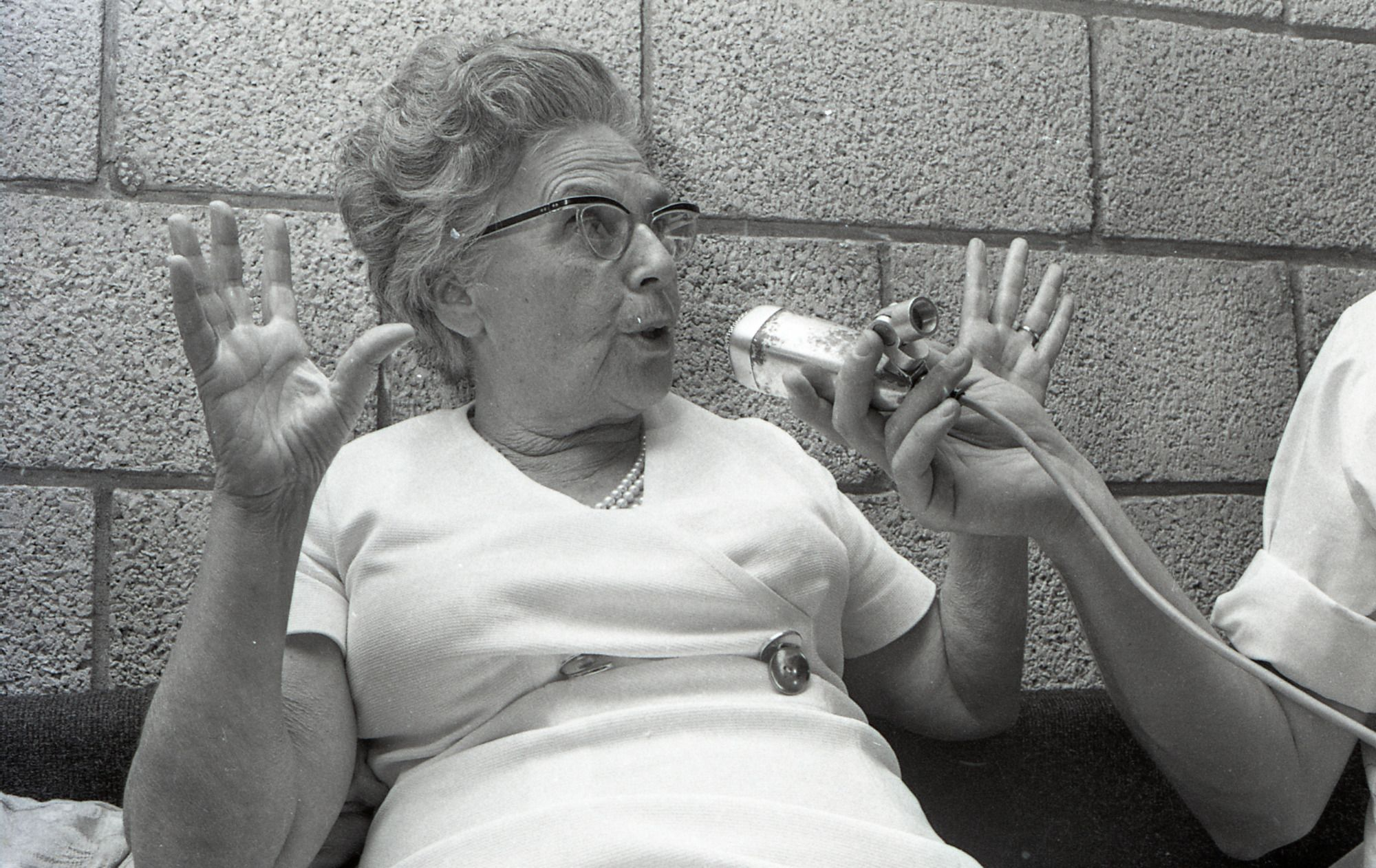
Ada Sereni being interviewed in 1969.

==== 1960s ====
Immediately after the Six-Day War, Sereni was appointed by Israel prime minister Levi Eshkol to, with Shlomo Gazit, be responsible for "concentrating efforts to encourage the residents of the Gaza Strip to leave the country."

=== Awards ===
In 1995 Sereni received the Israel Prize for special contribution to society and the country.

Sereni published an autobiography "I Clandestini Del Mara", "The Hidden Passengers of the Sea". In Hebrew it was titled, "Ships Without a Flag."

In the 1960 movie Exodus, Ada is represented.

In 2007, a film called "Exodus: Ada's Dream" was produced based on Sereni's autobiography, about her actions and efforts to organize the immigration of thousands of displaced Jews in Italy after World War II. It was broadcast on Italian television as a 4-episode miniseries on January 28 and 29, 2006 for Holocaust Remembrance Day, as well as on Israeli television. The film was screened at several festivals in the United States and at the 2007 World Jewish Film Festival in Tel Aviv, receiving enthusiastic feedback.

== End of life ==
Sereni helped found the Associazione Italia-Israele.

Sereni died in Jerusalem on November 24, 1998, at the age of 92.
