= Sdot Yam =

Kibbutz in northern Israel

Sdot Yam: שְׂדוֹת יָם (Hebrew); سدوت يام (Arabic)
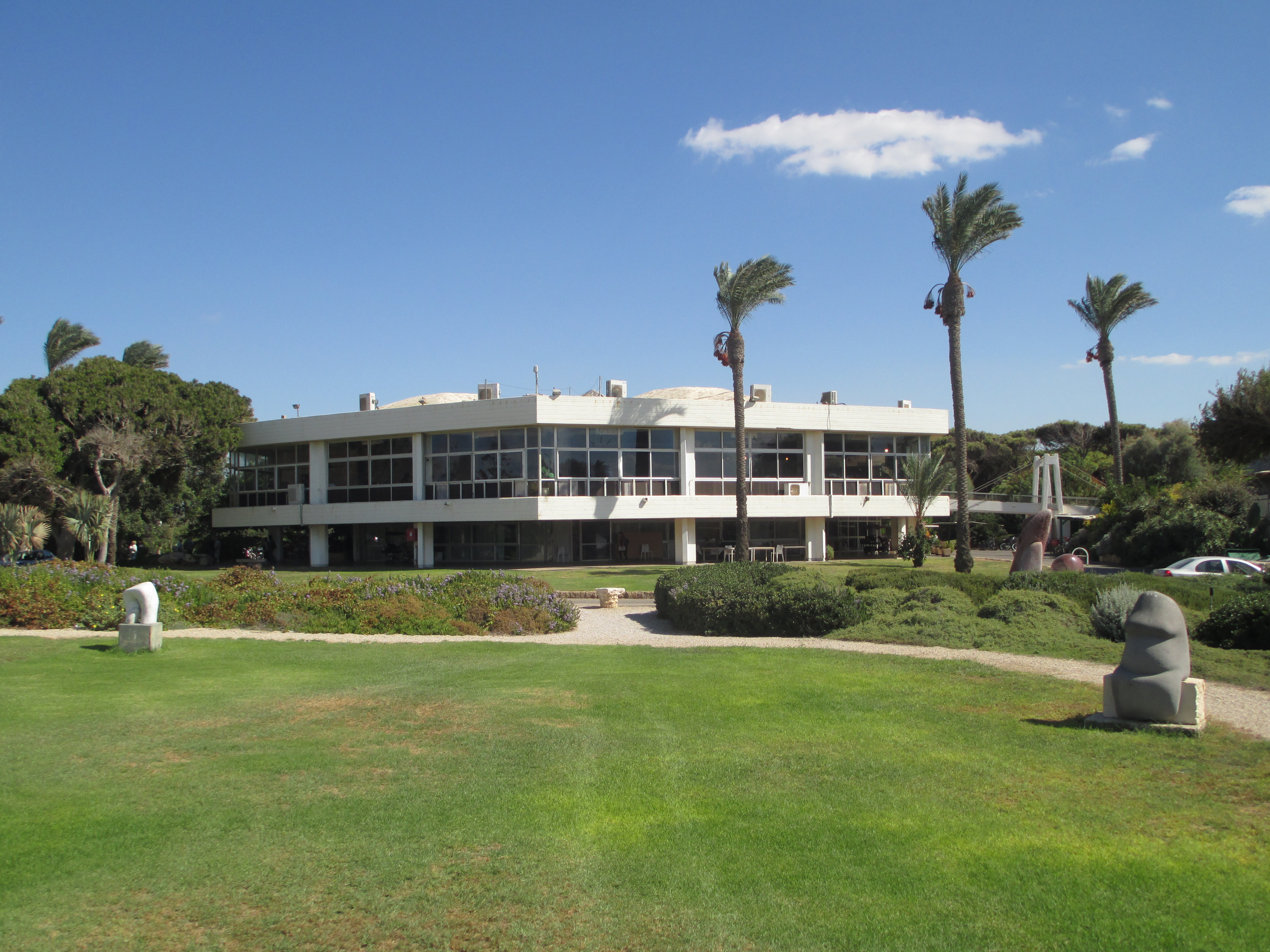
- Etymology: Sea Fields
- Location within Haifa region of Israel Location within Israel
- Coordinates: 32°29′27″N 34°53′34″E
- Country: Israel
- District: Haifa
- Subdistrict: Hadera
- Council: Hof HaCarmel
- Affiliation: Kibbutz Movement
- Founded: 1936 (in the Krayot); 1940 (current location)
- Founder: Scouts
- Population (2024): 1,161
- Website: www.sdot-yam.org.il

Sdot Yam (Hebrew: שְׂדוֹת יָם, lit. Sea Fields) is a kibbutz in the Haifa District of Israel. Located on the shore of the Mediterranean Sea, it falls under the jurisdiction of Hof HaCarmel Regional Council. In 2024 it had a population of 1,161.

It was founded in 1936 and moved to its present site at the southern border of the ancient city and archaeological ruins of Caesarea, in 1940.

== History ==
=== Northern location (1936–40) ===
Sdot Yam was established in 1936, in the region just north of Haifa, known as the Krayot. It was founded at the urging of David Ben-Gurion during a period when the British were restricting Jewish immigration to Mandatory Palestine. Although it was ostensibly established as a fishing village, it was in fact used as base by the Palmach to smuggle clandestine immigrants, primarily Jewish refugees from Europe, into Palestine. Yossi Harel, best known as the commander of SS Exodus and three other such ships, is buried at Sdot Yam.

=== Permanent location (after 1940) ===
In 1940, the kibbutz was moved to its present location south of Caesarea. Its new residents were a gar'in from the Mahanot HaOlim youth group.

== Economy ==
The kibbutz originally based its economy on fishing, but today concentrates on land-based agriculture. It manages a banana plantation, avocado trees, and a herd of dairy cattle. The kibbutz's major source of income comes from the marketing and manufacturing of engineered quartz surfaces under the Caesarstone brand. In 2013, the kibbutz owned a 58 percent stake in the company, which makes stone counter tops for kitchens and bathrooms. It sold the majority of it in October 2012. .

== Landmarks ==
The Hannah Szenes house is a study center founded in the name of Hungarian-born Hannah Szenes and the other paratroopers who were sent from Mandatory Palestine to war-torn Europe in 1944 to save Hungarian Jews.

== Notable people ==
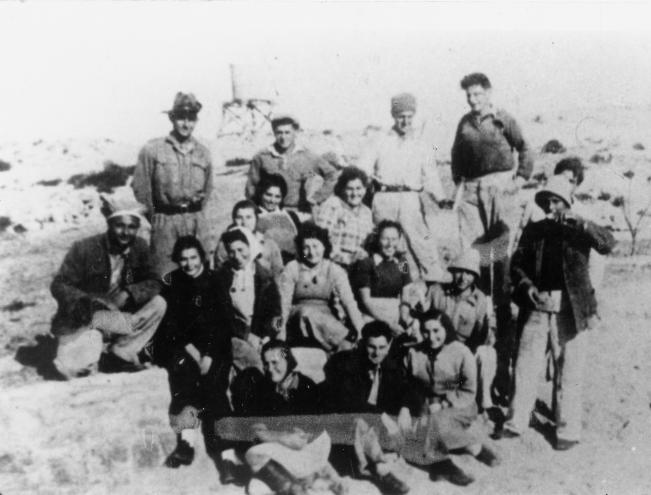
Hannah Szenes with members of Kibbutz Sdot Yam. (4th from left)

- Shimshon Brokman (born 1957), Olympic competitive sailor
- Nola Chilton, theatre-director, acting teacher, winner of the Israel Prize for Theater, 2013
- Gal Fridman (born 1975), Olympic gold-medal-winning windsurfer
- Aharon Megged, author and playwright
- Itzhak Nir (born 1940), Olympic competitive sailor
- Elam Rotem (born 1984 in Sdot Yam), Early music expert, especially of the Jewish-Italian Baroque composer Salamone Rossi
- Hannah Szenes, Special Operations Executive (SOE) paratrooper parachuted by the British Army into Yugoslavia during the Second World War to assist in the rescue of Hungarian Jews about to be deported to the German death camp at Auschwitz
- Gal Zukerman (born 2003), Olympic kite foiler
