= Hannah Szenes =

Jewish poet and anti-Nazi fighter in World War II

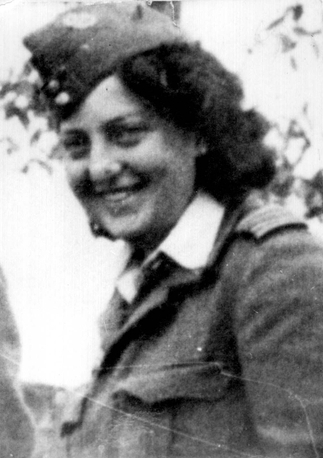
- Senesh in British army uniform in Yugoslavia, circa 1944
- Born: July 17, 1921; Budapest, Hungary
- Died: 7 November 1944 (aged 23); Budapest, Hungary
- Cause of death: Execution by firing squad
- Resting place: Mount Herzl, Israel
- Occupations: Poet; Paratrooper; Resistance fighter
- Known for: Jewish parachutist with SOE; author of Eli, Eli
- Parents: Béla Szenes; Katalin Szenes
- Military career
- Allegiance: United Kingdom
- Branch: British Army
- Service years: 1943–1944
- Unit: Special Operations Executive
- Conflicts: World War II
- Website: hannahsenesh.org.il

Hannah Szenes (often anglicized as Hannah Senesh or Chanah Senesh; Hebrew: חנה סנש; Hungarian: Szenes Hanna; 17 July 1921 – 7 November 1944) was a Jewish poet, playwright, and resistance operative trained by the British Special Operations Executive (SOE). In 1944, she was one of 37 Jewish volunteers from Mandatory Palestine parachuted into occupied Europe to support Allied efforts and help rescue Jews facing extermination.

After crossing into Hungary from Yugoslavia, she was captured by Hungarian gendarmes, imprisoned, and tortured but refused to reveal mission details. She was later tried for treason by a court under the fascist Arrow Cross regime and executed in Budapest.

Szenes is remembered in Israel as a national heroine, known for her poetry and for her actions during the Holocaust. Her most famous poem, A Walk to Caesarea ("Eli, Eli"), is frequently recited in commemorations.

== Early life ==
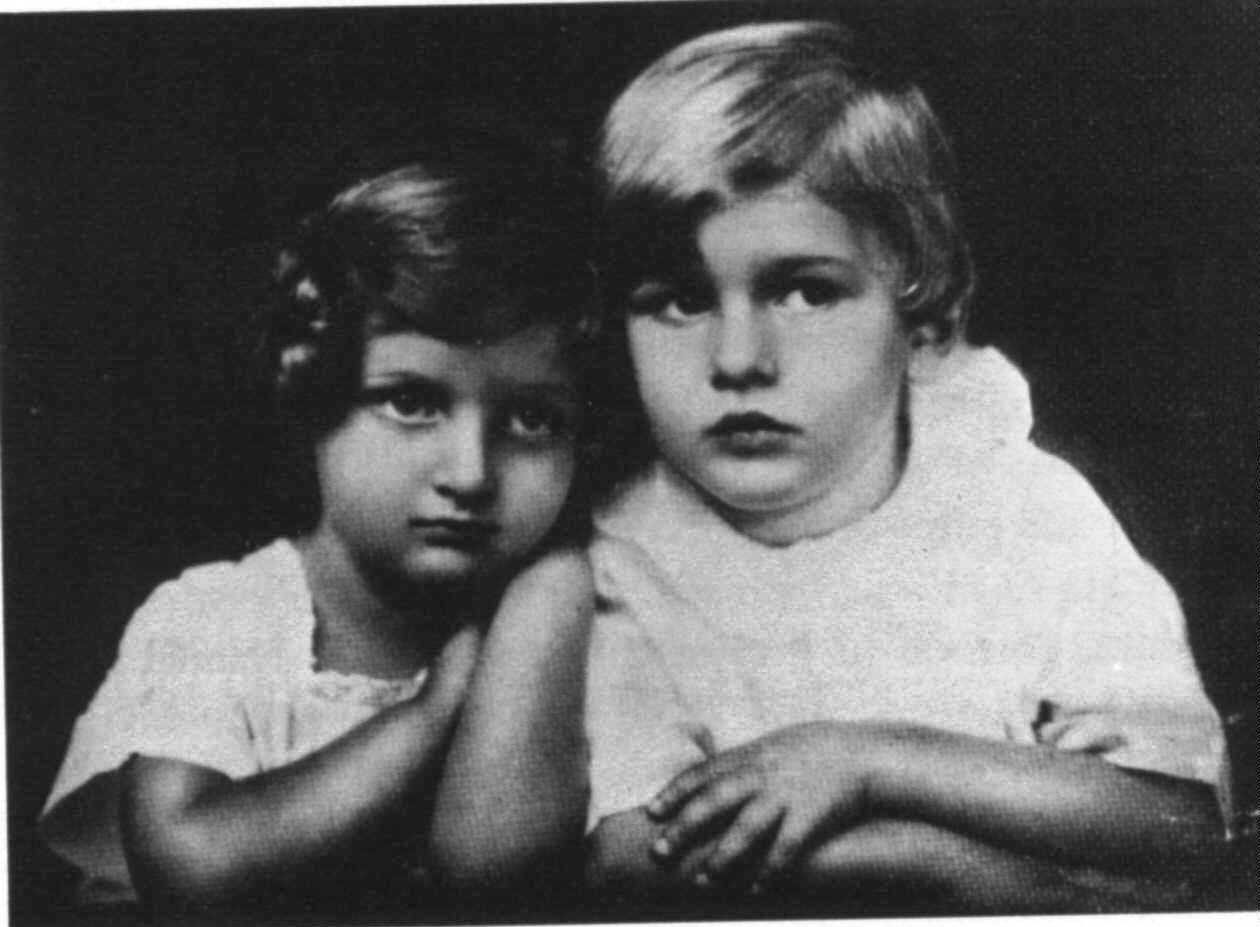
Szenes and her brother in Budapest c. 1924

Hannah Szenes was born in Budapest, Hungary, on 17 July 1921 to an assimilated Jewish family. Her father, Béla Szenes, a well-known journalist and playwright, died when she was young. She was raised by her mother, Katherine, alongside her brother György.

She attended a Protestant private school for girls that also admitted Catholic and Jewish students, but where non-Protestant pupils were required to pay higher fees. After being identified as a gifted student, Szenes was permitted to pay the reduced Catholic rate. Amid growing antisemitism in Hungary, Szenes became increasingly aware of the precarious status of Jews in society. She joined the Zionist youth movement Maccabea and began learning Hebrew.

== Life in Mandatory Palestine ==
Szenes graduated in 1939 and decided to emigrate to Mandatory Palestine in order to study in the Girls' Agricultural School at Nahalal. In 1941, she joined Kibbutz Sdot Yam and then joined the Haganah, the paramilitary group that laid the foundation of the Israel Defense Forces.

In 1943, she enlisted in the British Women's Auxiliary Air Force as an Aircraftwoman 2nd Class. Later the same year, she was recruited into the Special Operations Executive (SOE) and was sent to Egypt for parachute training.

== Parachutists' mission ==
Between 1943 and 1944, the Jewish community in Palestine (Yishuv) decided to send Jewish parachutists behind enemy lines to assist both Allied forces and the Jews in occupied Europe. The mission was a cooperation between the Yishuv and British forces to create a Jewish commando unit within the British army. The mission was supervised by SOE’s Middle East Headquarters in Cairo and coordinated with the British army and Haganah leaders in Palestine. The Jewish volunteers were trained in parachuting, sabotage, radio transmission, and survival in enemy territory. Szenes volunteered and was selected along with 32 others, out of 250 candidates, to be sent on active missions.

=== Capture and torture ===
On March 14, 1944, she and two colleagues were parachuted into Yugoslavia and joined a partisan group. After landing, they learned the Germans had already occupied Hungary, so the mission was called off as too dangerous.

Szenes continued on and headed for the Hungarian border. At the border, she and her two colleagues, Yoel Palgi and Peretz Goldstein were arrested by Hungarian gendarmes, who found her British military transmitter, used to communicate with the SOE and other partisans. She was taken to a prison, stripped, tied to a chair, then whipped and clubbed for three days. She lost several teeth as a result of the beatings.

The guards wanted to know the code for her transmitter so they could find out who the parachutists were and trap others. Transferred to a Budapest prison, Szenes was repeatedly interrogated and tortured, but only revealed her name and refused to provide the transmitter code, even when her mother was also arrested. They threatened to kill her mother if she did not cooperate, but she refused.

=== Trial and execution ===
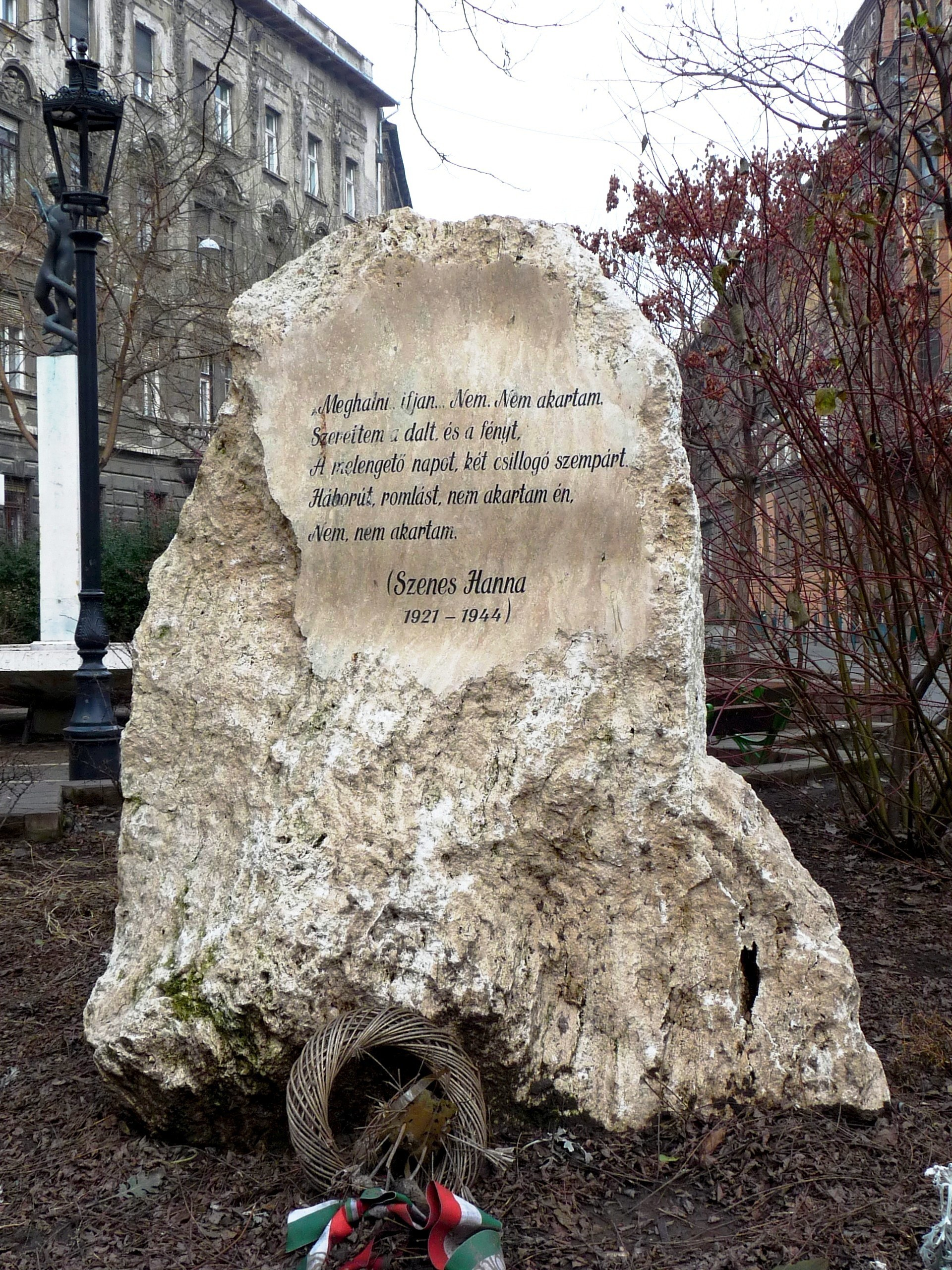
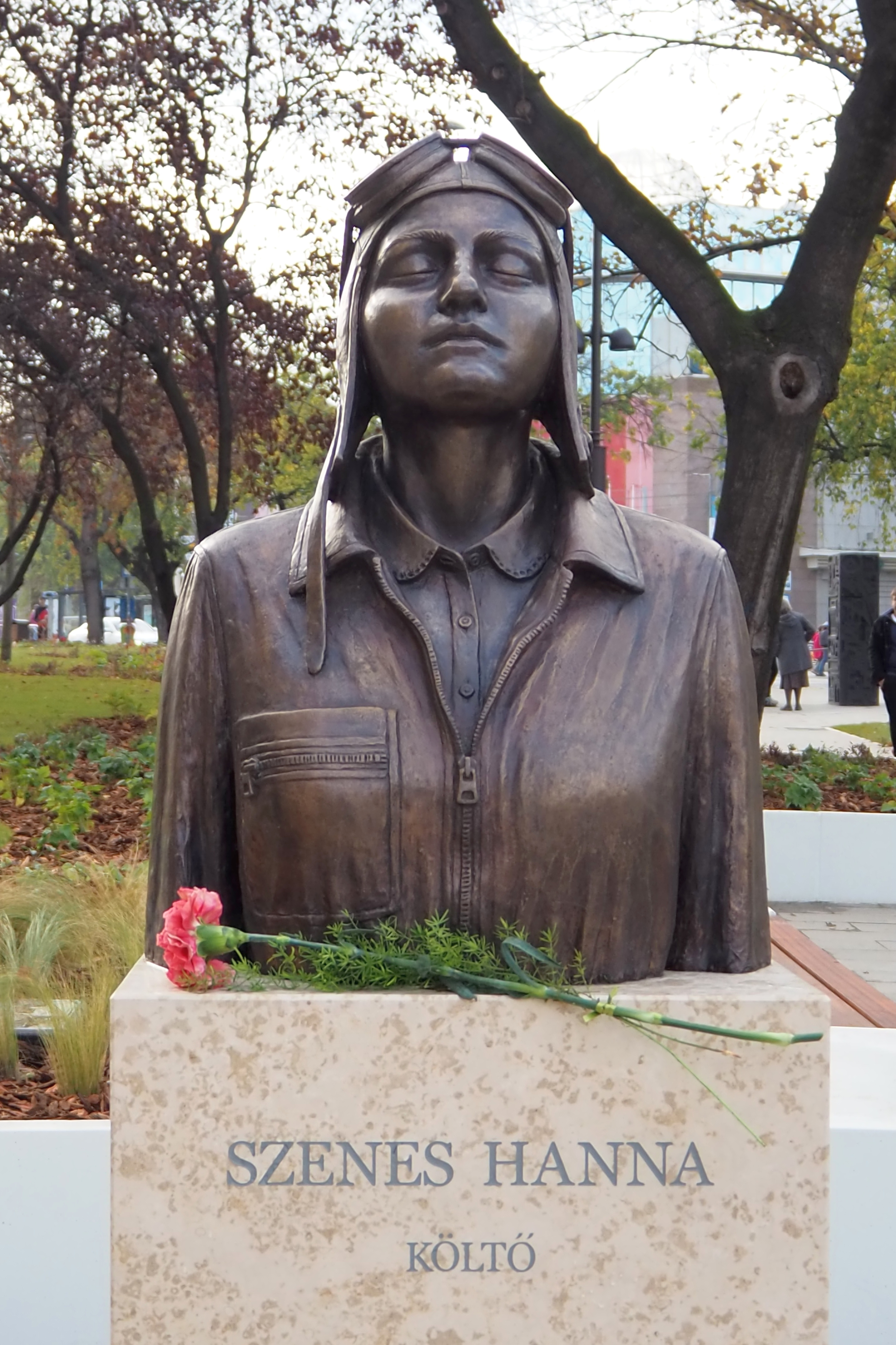
Memorial and bust of Hannah Szenes in Budapest

She was tried for treason in Hungary on 28 October 1944 by a court appointed by the fascist Arrow Cross regime. There was an eight-day postponement to give the judges more time to find a verdict, followed by another postponement, this one because of the appointment of a new Judge Advocate. She was executed by a firing squad on November 7, 1944. She kept diary entries until her last day. One of them read: "In the month of July, I shall be twenty-three/I played a number in a game/The dice have rolled. I have lost," and another: "I loved the warm sunlight."

While Szenes was in prison, another Jewish woman, Matilda Galtstein was arrested by the Nazis and became her cellmate. Szenes gave Matilda, who was pregnant, detailed plans on how to fake a fall and then escape from the infirmary through a window. Matilda later gave birth to a baby boy named Baruch. He related that he would say the kaddish prayer for Hannah Szenes on the 21st of the Cheshvan, the Hebrew date of her execution.

During the trial of Rudolf Kastner, who was a controversial figure involved in negotiating with the Nazis to save a number of Hungarian Jews during the Holocaust, Szenes's mother testified that during the time her daughter was imprisoned, Kastner's people had advised her not to obtain a lawyer for her daughter. Further, she recalled a conversation with Kastner after the war, telling him, "I don't say that you could have saved my daughter Hannah, but that you didn't try – it makes it harder for me that nothing was done."

After the Cold War, a Hungarian military court officially exonerated her. Her kin in Israel were informed on November 5, 1993.

== Legacy and commemoration ==
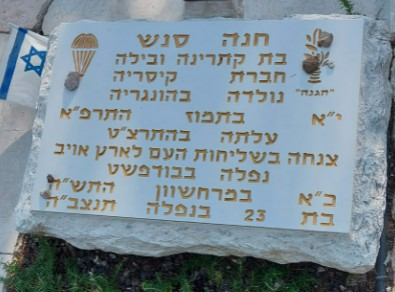
Szenes's gravestone at Mount Herzl

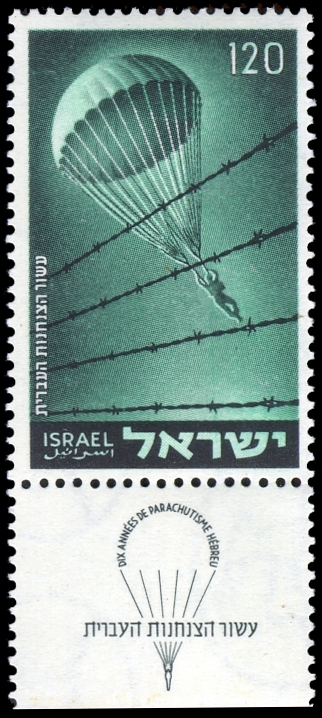
1955 Israeli stamp honoring the parachutists

Szenes's diary was published in Hebrew in 1946. Her remains were brought to Israel in 1950 and buried in the cemetery on Mount Herzl, Jerusalem. Her tombstone was brought to Israel in November 2007 and placed in Sdot Yam. Szenes has been a significant subject in film, stage, and narrative histories, where her life and mission have been dramatized to preserve her legacy.

=== Eli, Eli (A Walk to Caesarea) ===
Szenes was a poet and playwright, writing both in Hungarian and Hebrew. The best known of these is "A Walk to Caesarea", commonly known as Eli, Eli ("My God, My God"). The well-known melody was composed by David Zehavi. Many singers have performed it, including Ofra Haza, Regina Spektor, and Sophie Milman. It was used to close some versions of the film Schindler's List.

=== Film and documentary ===
- Hanna's War (1988), a feature film directed by Menahem Golan and starring Maruschka Detmers as Szenes
- Blessed is the Match: The Life and Death of Hannah Senesh (2008), a documentary film directed by Roberta Grossman that utilizes archival footage and primary documents to recount her life.

=== Stage and musical adaptations ===
- The Legend of Hannah Senesh (1964), a play by Aharon Megged that premiered at the Princess Theatre in Los Angeles, directed by Laurence Merrick and starring Joan Huntington
- Woman of Valor (2017), a live stage play directed by Devorah Levine.
- Hannah Senesh: A Play With Music and Song (2019), an off-Broadway play by the National Yiddish Theatre Folksbiene at the Museum of Jewish Heritage, starring Lexi Rabadi.
- Darkness (one two three) (2019), a musical pilot project led by Pazit Nuni, featuring a musical composition of Szenes's final poem.
- "Four Poems by Hannah Szenes" (2023), a song cycle for soprano and piano composed by Serban Nichifor.

=== Narrative histories ===
- Crash of the Heavens (2025), a narrative nonfiction work by Douglas Century that provides a contemporary re-examination of Szenes's role in the Allied military mission.

== Gallery ==
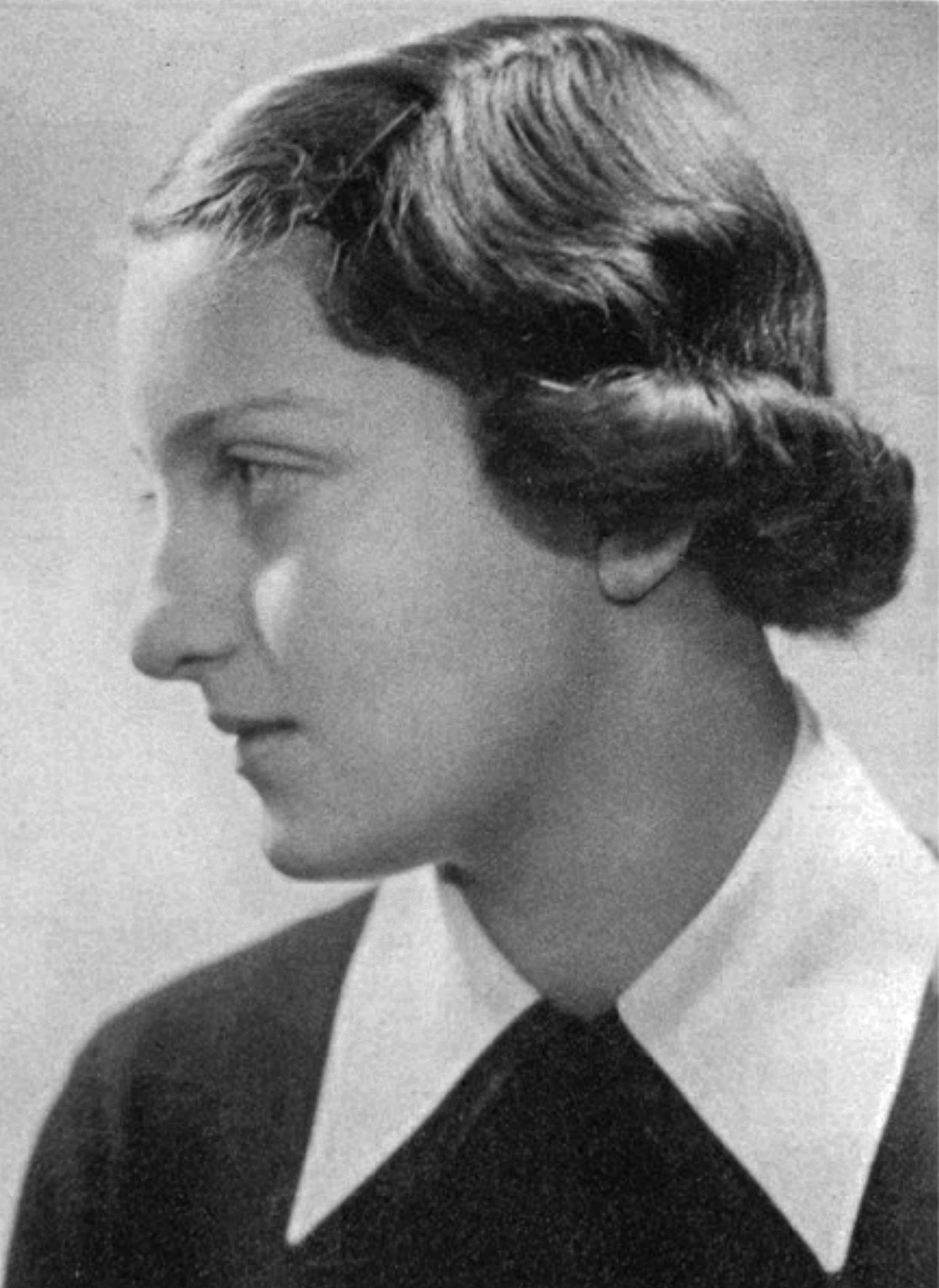
Szenes, age 16, in Budapest

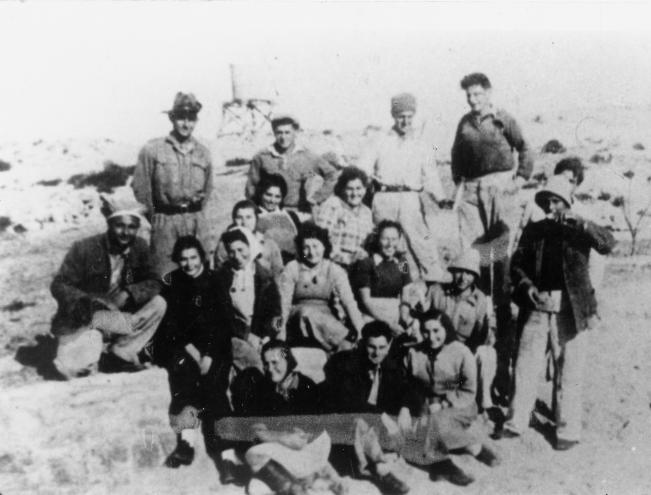
Szenes, seated center, with members of Kibbutz Sdot Yam

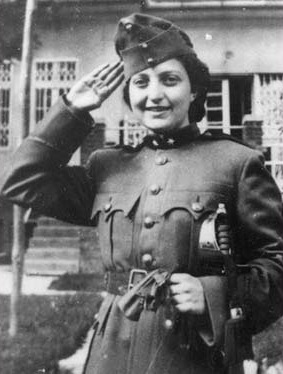
Szenes in a Hungarian army uniform as a Purim costume
