= Reuven Dafni =

Croatian-Israeli soldier and diplomat (1913–2005)

- ראובן דפני
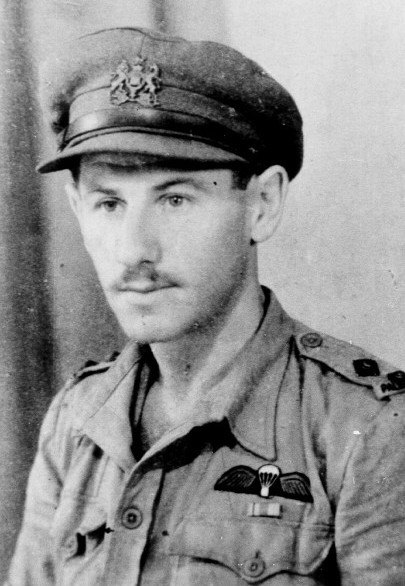
- Reuven Dafni around 1945
- Born: Ruben Kandt; 11 November 1913; Zagreb, Kingdom of Croatia-Slavonia, Austria-Hungary
- Died: 15 June 2005 (aged 91); Israel

Reuven Dafni (Hebrew: ראובן דפני; born Ruben Kandt; 11 November 1913 – 13 June 2005) was an Israeli soldier and diplomat. He was also one of the founders of kibbutz Ein Gev and a longtime assistant director of the Yad Vashem memorial center.

== Early life ==
Dafni was born on 11 November 1913, in Zagreb, in what was then the largely-autonomous region of Croatia-Slavonia in Austria-Hungary. He came from an educated family that was Croatian and Jewish; he had two siblings. At the end of the World War I, the region was united with Serbia, to form the Kingdom of Yugoslavia.

In the early 1930s, Dafni was studying in Vienna, where his father was a diplomat: he was a keen athlete, a member of the student union and an activist in the Zionist youth movement.

In 1936, Dafni emigrated to Mandatory Palestine, then under British administration, and became one of the founders of kibbutz Ein Gev.

== War service ==
In 1940, he took up arms against the Nazis and joined the British Army. He served in the Greek Campaign and in the Battle of Crete, as well as in the North African Campaign.

In 1942, a new Palestine Regiment, was created and Dafni was one of its soldiers. He also volunteered for training for special operations. He was recruited to become one of the Jewish parachutists from Palestine who operated behind enemy lines recruited by the Special Operations Executive.

In mid-March 1944, along with several other agents, Dafni was parachuted behind enemy lines into occupied Yugoslavia. He met up with the Yugoslav Partisans and kept them in contact with the Western Allies; he spent six months in Croatia. He subsequently went to Cairo and joined the Jewish Brigade, which fought in the Italian Campaign. While stationed in Bari, Italy, he met one of his brothers who was serving in the United States Army and learned from him that his father and older brother had survived the Holocaust: they subsequently came to Mandatory Palestine after spending time in a refugee camp in Italy. His mother was killed in 1941.

For his war-service, Warrant Officer (Company Sergeant-Major) Dafni was recognised with a Mention in Despatches (MiD). He was also commissioned as an officer.

== Post-war ==
Eretz Israel

After the war he returned to his kibbutz, but in 1946, as a member of the Haganah, Dafni went to the United States to raise funds and purchase weapons for the defence of the Yishuv; one of his contributors was Bugsy Siegel. Dafni returned to the United States in 1948, now helping to raise funds for the newly established State of Israel.

Diplomat

In 1948, he was also appointed as the first Israeli consul in Los Angeles. From 1953 to 1956, he served as consul general of Israel in New York City. Later, he also served as consul general in Bombay, India, and also served as ambassador to Kenya (1969 to 1973) and Thailand.

Yad Vashem

For 13 years, from 1983 to 1996, Dafni served as assistant director, in Jerusalem, of Yad Vashem: Israel's official memorial to the victims of the Holocaust.

== Family life ==
Dafni was married to Rina (née Grossman) with whom he had two children, a son, Yoram, and a daughter, Avital. The couple later divorced and Dafni remarried twice.
