= A. L. Zissu =

Romanian Jewish writer, politician and industrialist (1888–1956)

Abraham Leib "A. L." Zissu
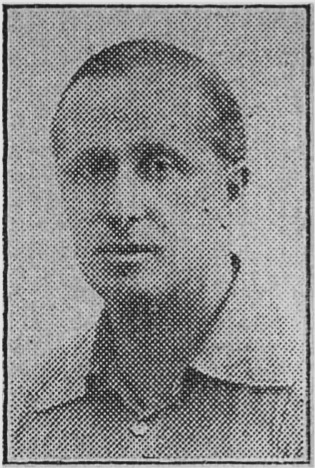
- Zissu, photographed c. 1935

President of the Jewish Party
- In office September 18, 1944 – July 21, 1946
- Preceded by: none (Tivadar Fischer to 1938)
- Succeeded by: Collective leadership

Chairman of the Romanian Zionist Executive
- In office January 1944 – c. September 1945
- Preceded by: none (Mișu Benvenisti to 1943)
- Succeeded by: Bernard Rohrlich

Personal details
- Born: January 25, 1888 Piatra Neamț, Kingdom of Romania
- Died: September 6, 1956 (aged 68) Tel Aviv, Israel
- Other political affiliations: Zionist Union (1915); Jewish Democratic Front (1942–1944)
- Spouse: Rachel Zimmer
- Children: Theodor (Theodore) Zissu (1916–1942)
- Profession: Novelist, journalist, religious scholar, industrialist, publisher, restaurateur, inventor

Abraham Leib Zissu (first name also Avram, middle name also Leiba or Leibu; Hebrew: אברהם לייב זיסו; January 25, 1888 – September 6, 1956) was a Romanian writer, political essayist, industrialist, and spokesman of the Jewish Romanian community. Of modest social origin and a recipient of Hasidic education, he became a cultural activist, polemicist, and newspaper founder, remembered primarily for his Mântuirea daily. During the 1910s, he involved himself in the effort to unify and reactivate the local Zionist movement. By the end of World War I, Zissu also emerged as a theorist of Religious Zionism, preferring communitarianism and self-segregation to the assimilationist option, while also promoting literary modernism in his activity as novelist, dramatist, and cultural sponsor. He was the inspiration behind the Jewish Party, which competed with the mainstream Union of Romanian Jews (UER) for the Jewish vote. Zissu and UER leader Wilhelm Filderman had a lifelong disputation over religious and practical politics, which gave way to a mutual dislike punctuated by episodes of fraternization.

Always a confrontational critic of antisemitism, Zissu found himself marginalized by fascist regimes in the late 1930s and for most of World War II—though his calls for abolishing the rabbinate continued to be celebrated in Romania's right-wing circles. During the Holocaust, he risked his personal freedom to defend the interests of his community, and was especially vocal in antagonizing the collaborationist Central Jewish Office. He eventually reached a compromise with the Ion Antonescu regime when the latter curbed its deportations of Jews to Transnistria, and, after 1943, helped initiate the Aliyah Bet exodus of Romanian and Hungarian Jews to Mandatory Palestine. Such efforts required that he contact and build a working relationship with high-ranking officials of the regime, including Mihai Antonescu, Radu Lecca, and Pamfil Șeicaru. Though backed by the Rescue Committee of the Jewish Agency and the World Jewish Congress, his contribution is at the center of an enduring controversy, focusing on his alleged favoritism of Zionist Jews and his cantankerousness. He had a reluctant collaboration with the more junior Zionist Mișu Benvenisti, who emerged as one of his key rivals.

In 1942, while held at Târgu Jiu internment camp, Zissu was co-opted by the Romanian resistance cells, and formed a political bond with Antonescu rival Nicolae Rădescu. Assisting M. H. Maxy of the Romanian Communist Party, he established links with the more mainstream National Peasants' Party. He and Maxy also formed a Jewish Democratic Front, holding seats on its Central Committee alongside Leon Ghelerter. From 1944, they helped finance the underground movement against Antonescu. As part of such organizational efforts, Zissu personally handled the accommodation of Jewish parachutists, including Shaike Dan Trachtenberg. He also persuaded the increasingly defeatist Romanian regime not to tolerate pogroms on its territory. Shortly after the Coup of August 1944, which restored democracy, Zissu's Zionism merged with explicit anti-communism, clashing directly with the Communist Party's anti-cosmopolitan agenda; he also found himself opposed to the mainstream groups in Romania and Palestine, criticizing Labor Zionism and celebrating Zionist political violence when used against British authorities.

The creation of a monopolistic Jewish Democratic Committee, led by Maxy and favored by Benvenisti, resulted in Zissu's near-complete marginalization in political life; friends quarreled with him when he publicized his anticlericalism, which specifically targeted Chief Rabbi Alexandru Șafran. In that context, Zissu veered toward a non-communist "Biblical socialism", which he envisaged as the doctrine of a new political group in Israel. After 1948, his renewed effort to ensure the mass emigration of Romanian Jews, and his contacts with Israeli government officials, made him a target for the communist regime. In 1951, he was arrested and tortured into confessing that he had spied for Israel; in 1954, he was sentenced to life imprisonment for the crime of high treason. Zissu was granted amnesty after two years, having spent most of them in the notoriously harsh Pitești prison. Finally allowed to emigrate in July 1956, he died less than two months later in a Tel Aviv hospital. He left a corpus of works in various languages, including Hebrew, many of which survive as manuscripts.

== Biography ==
=== Zionist beginnings ===
==== Early life and debut ====
Abraham Leib was born into a Hasidic Jewish family in Piatra Neamț. His surname was the Romanianized form of the given name "Züs", but is coincidentally spelled the same as an Aromanian name, also used in Romania, which signifies "living sibling". His parents were Pincu Zissu, a bank accountant, and his wife Hinda-Lea; he had nine siblings. The Zissus were traditionally involved in Jewish community life, with Pincu cited as an organizer of vigils held in Bârlad for the victims of the 1905 Kishinev pogrom. Several sources describe Abraham as the brother-in-law of poet-journalist Tudor Arghezi and uncle of photographer Eleazar "Eli" Teodorescu, through his sister Constanța Zissu. However, more detailed accounts show Constanța as being born in Pitești to an unrelated Zissu family.

Zissu held the belief that his birthplace was intimately connected with Hasidic history, proposing that parts of Ceahlău Massif, known as Valea Jidovului ("Jew's Valley"), were named for Baal Shem Tov. He received a semi-formal Talmudic education, excelling in the study of both Hebrew and Yiddish sources; he may also have been well acquainted with the Kabbalah, which informed his later work as a novelist. At age twenty, he obtained a rabbi's diploma; although this was recognized by Casa Școalelor agency, he never practiced. At Piatra Neamț, the Zissu siblings had for a friend the younger Eugen Relgis, later a noted anarchist ideologue and writer of Jewish topics. Visiting Iași, Zissu formed a lasting bond with the Jewish intellectuals Elias and Moses Schwarzfeld, being introduced to their literary circle.

In December 1907, Zissu and D. Kahane represented Piatra at the 10th Zionist Conference, held in Galați. Here, he advocated for a "spiritual Zionism", which he viewed as more important than group organization. Zissu had begun writing for the Iași-based Egalitatea magazine in 1904, aged sixteen, and did so until 1910. That year, he entered into conflict with the city's students, who were under the influence of antisemitic professor A. C. Cuza. Also in 1910, he was hired at Iași's Moldova Bank, where he led a workers' strike in 1914. He was also involved with the Jewish cultural movement in Iași, working alongside Samson Lazăr-Șaraga, Iacob Ashel Groper, and Jacob Itzhak Niemirower. In February 1912, he and I. Schoenberg represented Iași at the "30 Years of Zionism" celebration in Bucharest, where they met writer Nahum Sokolow. Around that time, Zissu also met and befriended the painter Reuven Rubin, "a sort of disciple" of his who emigrated to France in 1923.

Together with Petre Constantinescu-Iași, Zissu published the weekly literary magazine Floare Albastră ("Blue Flower"), which ran for six editions at Iași in 1912 and had the young poet Benjamin Fondane (of the Schwarzfeld family) among its noted contributors. The publication was mostly traditionalist and neo-romantic, opposed to both the Symbolist movement and the left-wing Viața Romînească. Zissu and most of the contributors, including Fondane and Sandu Teleajen, were pseudonymous; signed contributions included pieces by Ludovic Dauș, Enric Furtună, Constantin Motaș and Grigore T. Popa. In parallel, also in 1912, Zissu and Menahem Mendel Braunstein put out the Hebrew-language Ha-Mekits ("The Awakener"). He debuted as an author in 1914, with the play David Brandeis, and began writing for the Yiddish revival journal Likht ("Light"). In July 1913, Romania intervened in the Second Balkan War. As leaders of the Zionist Union of Iași, Zissu and Lazăr-Șaraga urged Romanian Jews to volunteer for service in the Land Forces, and thus to give proof of their "most profound patriotic sentiments".

==== First Mântuirea period ====
The following period brought a decline in Zionist activities, which began as the Federal Committee of Galați went inactive. The Zionist Union of Iași participated in the Bucharest Zionist Conference of May 1915, which was called up by I. Herșcovici and his dissident lodge, Idealul. He, Lazăr-Șaraga, and the other Iași delegates asked for the Federal Committee to be deposed. When this proposal was vetoed, they still called on the Committee to immediately convene a meeting of the "regional conferences". In November, Zissu himself was the Union's delegate to the Zionist Consultation, also held in Bucharest; while there, he participated in the creation of a Romanian-wide Propaganda Committee. Around that time, Zissu married the seven-years-younger Rachel Zimmer, daughter of oils trader Carol Zimmer, who was based in Bucharest. Their son Theodor (later Theodore) Zissu, himself a prominent Zionist, was born in 1916. He was Abraham and Rachel's only child.

Zissu reemerged publicly during the end of World War I campaigns. In 1918, together with the Romanian Orthodox priest Gala Galaction (with whom he had a long-lasting friendship) and Léon Algazi, Zissu published Spicul magazine, which closed after two numbers. In 1919, he founded the Zionist daily newspaper Mântuirea in Bucharest; he served as director and constant contributor from 1919 to 1921, inviting Fondane and Isac Ludo to join him as co-editors. The team also included B. Florian, husband of the avant-garde writer who signed with the masculine pen name Filip Corsa. According to historian Camelia Crăciun, the publication may be seen as Zissu's "masterpiece", "one of the most important Jewish political publications during the interwar period and also as the major Zionist journal in Romania". In tandem, Zissu joined Fondane and Armand Pascal's modernist theater company, Insula.

These cultural and political activities blended with Zissu's activity in the realm of business. Journalist Christel Wollmann-Fiedler sees his major successes in that field as the result of his "extremely sharp intelligence" and his penchant for lucrative investments, but also notes that he was helped along by his Zimmer relatives. In March 1920, he joined up with the Peasant Bank, together with whom he purchased Constantin Vernescu's inheritance from its institutional inheritor, namely the Romanian Academy. Also in 1920, Zissu was running a sugar factory in Ripiceni, Botoșani County. He also worked in an iron forge and for several forestry firms in Neamț County, and later owned both the Ripiceni factory and the Omega Oil Press in Bucharest. His work in forestry and the sugar processing industry was bridged once he began using a novel recipe for extracting sugar out of fir trees.

In mid-1922, Viața Romînească agreed to publish Zissu's play, În slujba celorlalți ("A Servant to Others"). As recounted by editorial secretary Mihail Sevastos, they only did so upon being urged by staff member Dimitrie D. Pătrășcanu, in hopes that the "filthy rich" Zissu, "that guy with the sugar", would then sponsor the struggling magazine (he never did). Sevastos reports that most of the group agreed that the text, while not disastrously bad, was below their aesthetic standard, and "mannerist". Mântuirea was closed through a government order in December 1922, following Zissu's open letter to Cuza's National-Christian Defense League, which resulted in the editorial offices being stormed by angered far-right students. Reportedly, Zissu's wealth allowed him to act as a lender or benefactor for Romanian and Jewish intellectuals, including journalist-philosopher Nae Ionescu (before Ionescu's turn to antisemitism). From 1924, he sponsored the Jewish modernist Vilna Troupe, which he relocated to Bucharest. The Zissus were mainly based in Weimar Germany from as early as 1920. In 1929, with revenues from the sugar industry, Zissu commissioned Michael Rachlis, the Russian architect, to build him a luxurious Art Deco home in Berlin-Grunewald, currently known as Villa Zissu. The project's completion cost him 20 million lei. Before 1925, Zissu also paid for a monument to be erected on the grave of Galați poet Barbu Nemțeanu, who had been his close friend.

==== Religious Zionism ====
A deeply devout individual (he wrote in 1947 that: "my childhood and adolescence were consumed by the incandescent flame of a religious frenzy"), Zissu is described by historian Hildrun Glass as "the best-known propagandist of the Jewish national movement in the Romanian Old Kingdom." He described himself as generally influenced by the metaphysics of Martin Buber, the politics of Theodor Herzl, and the "modern rationalist protest" of Ahad Ha'am. In effect, Zissu adopted Religious Zionism, favoring a return to "authentic Judaism", but also an "integral" Jewish nationalism that resembled the Revisionist variety. By 1944, he was confessing his admiration for Revisionist ideologue Ze'ev Jabotinsky. University of Haifa scholar Béla Vágó describes Zissu as the "authoritarian" and "rightist" exponent of Romanian Zionism, while historian Yehuda Bauer indicates that, though he never joined the Revisionists, his political views "gradually veered" into that territory.

At Mântuirea, Zissu celebrated the presence of Menachem Ussishkin as Jewish representative at the Paris Peace Conference; he also saluted the setting aside of Mandatory Palestine as a home for the "one and indivisible" Jewish nation. In March 1919, he began arguing that Zionism was "virtually the entirety of Romanian Judaism", professing his belief that the Union of Romanian Jews (UER), which supported Jewish assimilation, was politically irrelevant. The solution was to establish an all-Zionist National Council (Sfat Național), which would have reduced the assimilationists to their actual position in society. In opposing the UER's Wilhelm Filderman, Zissu favored self-segregated cohabitation ("the right of legal self-administration in all the matters connected to national life"). During the early years of Greater Romania, he rejected offers made by Take Ionescu and his Nationalist Conservatives, who wanted the Jews fully integrated as Romanians of the Judaic faith. Zissu called the notion "archaic" and uncultured. His own influence was exercised through the Zionist splinter group and newspaper Renașterea Noastră ("Our Revival"), founded in 1922, and, from c. 1931, through the Jewish Party (PER). After initially declining inne-party promotion, he served as honorary president of the PER. As noted by historian Idith Zertal,

[Zissu then mounted] an aggressive campaign [...] against Filderman's 'assimilationist' tendencies. Only his party, [Zissu] claimed, represented the ethnic political interests of the Jewish population in Romania; all the other bodies were capitulationist and collaborationist and detrimental to Jewish interests.

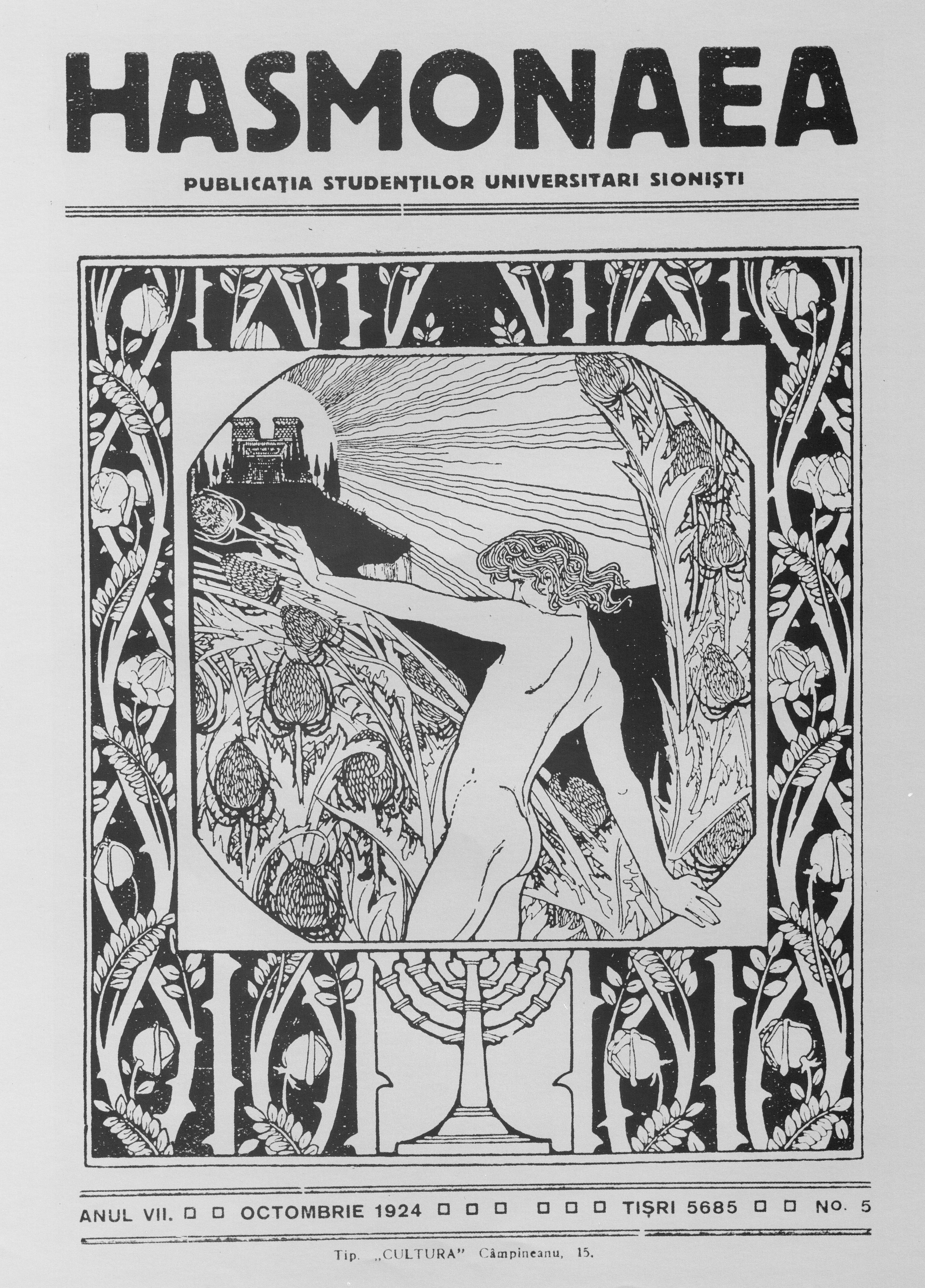
Cover of Hasmonaea, the Romanian Zionist magazine, in 1924

Scholars Jean Ancel and Camelia Crăciun also see Zissu as an unjust critic of Filderman, noting that the latter was not ever adverse to Zionism. Yet, Filderman "insisted in continuing to fight for civic and political rights in Diaspora, here conflicting with the Zionists." The Zissu–Filderman dispute was expanded in 1922, the year of complete Jewish emancipation: Filderman proposed that Jews be granted Romanian citizenship on the basis of individual pledges, while Zissu insisted that recognition of their native status needed to be seconded by local Jewish bodies.

This became a philosophical dissensus, with Zissu accusing Filderman of having forsaken the legal tenets of the Halakha. For his part, Filderman expressed fears that Zissu's "integral" concept of Judaism and his party's self-segregationist stance "would cast an abyss between the Romanian people and the Jewish population." His channel of communication with Nae Ionescu was ensured through the latter's newspaper, Cuvântul. According to the recollections of publicist M. Saul, Zissu personally intervened to have the Jewish author Ion Călugăru, whom he had personally trained in the Kabbalah, as a Cuvântul staff writer. In a 1931 interview with Călugăru, Zissu indicated that the PER was also a "bourgeois" group, which was similar to, and compatible with, all other middle-class parties in Romania, and that this shared agenda could dissuade fears about self-segregation. He noted that Jewish nationalism was advantageous for the centralized state—since, in the newly-acquired Transylvania and Bessarabia, it placed non-assimilated Jews under the cultural dominance of Romanian Jews.

==== Hasidic modernism ====
Zissu only left the Germany for important assignments: ahead of the general election of June 1931, he was in Bucharest, trying to usurp an alliance formed between the UER and the governing Romanian Democratic Nationalists. In that context, he argued that the UER was a "fictitious organization" existing for "Mr Filderman's political ascent", and proposed that the PER be instead recognized as a legitimate government partner. He was still present in numerous interwar publications of a leftist or avant-garde bent: Egalitatea, Curierul Israelit, Opinia, Steagul, Hatikvah of Galați, Lumea Evree, Integral, Bilete de Papagal, Puntea de Fildeș, Adam and Hasmonaea. David Brandeis was followed by two volumes of short stories: Spovedania unui candelabru ("Confession of a Chandelier"), 1926; and Ereticul de la Mânăstirea Neamțu ("The Heretic at Neamț Monastery"), 1930. He followed up with polemics and essays: "Noi" – breviar iudaic ("'Us' – A Primer for Judaism"), 1932; Logos, Israel, Biserica ("Logos, Israel, The Church"), 1937. In the latter work, Zissu spoke of "mystification and falsehood" contained in the New Testament, remarking that the Christian Church had historically acted as a "straitjacket of the peoples". This period saw him debating with priest Toma Chiricuță, who advocated the mass Christianization of Jews.

With his comedic fragments in Integral, Zissu took on avant-garde trappings, and, critic Paul Cernat notes, provided a "timid" Romanian version of international Futurism. His other texts were poems and stories of life in the shtetl, which broke with Integral's modernist agenda, and were possibly only published there on Fondane's request; Fondane also translated and published some of them upon his relocation to France. According to Zissu himself, "all of them are mystical and mostly inspired by the 'Hasidic' movement for the spiritual emancipation of Jewish masses". They include Spovedania unui candelabru, as La confession d'un candélabre (1928). Praised by reviewer Jean Martory as "one of mankind's most admirable works", this story gives voice to a menorah whose metal was mixed with tears. In Ereticul..., a Jewish convert turned Orthodox monk returns to his original faith; included in the same collection, the story Uziel follows a Jewish man on his doomed path to become Baal Shem. According to critic Leon Feraru, both works show a "startling craft".

While active in the interwar press, Zissu engaged himself in renewed polemics with both the radical left and the radical right. In March 1932, Ion Vinea hosted in Facla Zissu's critique of Stalinism (and comparatively positive assessment of Trotskyism), with a caveat that observed its noncompliance with the editorial line. In May, the same newspaper hosted a rebuttal of Zissu's stance. In November 1933, Zissu debated with the increasingly radical Nae Ionescu about the "Jewish Question" in Romania. Responding in Cuvântul, Ionescu noted that he shared Zissu's anti-assimilationist goals, and that he only wanted to see "Romanians of the Mosaic faith" returning to the status of "Jews with Romanian citizenship" (a position that Ionescu would soon discard in favor of racial exclusion). The debate was mocked by the left-wing writers at Șantier, who suggested that Zissu and Ionescu favored equally authoritarian stances. During that interval, a polemic over Zissu also opposed Arghezi to the radical avant-garde author, Stephan Roll: in October 1931, Arghezi published an encomium of Zissu; according to Roll, the piece was sponsored by the industrialist.

In 1934, Zissu prefaced Theodor Loewenstein-Lavi's primer for the Zionist youth, expressing his confidence that the movement had reached "maturity" and overcome "sterility". His Zionist-themed novels, also published at the time, made a particular impression. They include: Manuel sin Marcu (1934), Calea Calvarului ("The Path of Calvary", 1935), Samson și noul Dragon ("Samson and the New Dragon", 1939). The former book was mistakenly printed as Marcu sin Marcu, and is still known to many historians under that title; according to literary critic Răzvan Voncu, this indicates that many reviewers had not actually read the book beyond the title page. It shows Manuel, the title character, as torn between his attraction for European modernism and his longing for the Moldavian shtetl. A secondary character, Nusen, is seen by Voncu as based on Fondane.

While Fondane himself described Zissu as a writer who went beyond the cliches of modern Jewish literature, scholar Leon Volovici argued: "Zissu's passion for ideological debate [...] led him to produce fiction that is highly rhetorical and excessively discursive." Crăciun also notes "the unevenness of his works", with Zissu being more of a "great thinker" than a writer of "artistic value". In a sympathetic review for Cuvântul in 1932, fellow Jewish novelist Mihail Sebastian described Zissu as a "surprising" author, but identified sad undertones in his Zionist enthusiasm: "Mr. Zissu believes that he has found a spiritual island on which the nation of Israel may settle calmly and constructively. I fear that this belief of his comprises more desperation than tranquility." Critic Mihai Mîndra discusses Samson și noul Dragon (with a Hasidic protagonist) as a sample of Gothic fiction, but also a "huge allegorical representation of the drama of non-acculturation of the Romanian Jew", producing "spiritual solitude". He finds a parallel in Isac Ludo's novels, in that both writers seek to escape a direct confrontation with the contemporary rise of antisemitism, by delving into "Romanian Jewish evasionism."

=== Against Nazism ===
==== 1933–1941 crises ====
Zissu and his wife lived in Berlin before and after the Nazi seizure of power. In December 1934, they received a visit from Nae Ionescu's son, Radu, who found the senior couple to be glib, and described Rachel as "ugly". As the same Ionescu reports, Theodore had been "suddenly forgotten" by all his German friends, and no longer wished to spend time in Berlin. He had been sent to live in England, taking a law degree from Trinity College, Cambridge. His parents finally relocated to Bucharest in 1936, upon which their estate in Grunewald was confiscated by Nazi Germany. Describing Zissu as stingy, Mihail Sevastos noted that his economizing was for nothing, and that Zissu escaped Adolf Hitler "only with the clothes on his back." Abraham and Rachel took up residence on Lascăr Catargiu Boulevard, Dorobanți. Later, their home was in west-central Bucharest, on Aurel Vlaicu Street. From 1937 to 1944, under a series of increasingly authoritarian regimes which reintroduced antisemitic laws, Zissu had no literary occupation, being banned from journalism and writing. For a while, he acted as a source of knowledge for Gala Galaction, who was translating thr Bible into Romanian. The Siguranța secret police followed his contacts with both Nae Ionescu and the Renașterea Noastră group, and monitored his correspondence with Roll, who had become Integral's communist poet.

With a self-coup in February 1938, King Carol II established the National Renaissance Front. It dissolved all opposition groups, ending Zissu's tenure as honorary president of the Jewish Party. Jewish representation was reduced to one seat in the Senate, automatically assigned to the Chief Rabbi. Zissu had become a leading critic of Rabbinic Judaism, and therefore questioned this arrangement. With articles in the communitarian journal Cuvântul Evreesc, he suggested that Judaism did not fit a religious definition—and that rabbis did not represent anyone; his verdict was positively quoted by the antisemitic publication Porunca Vremii, which proposed that Zissu himself needed to be made Chief Rabbi. His old associates at Hasmonaea were upset by his overarching anticlericalism, suggesting that it relied on mistranslated portions of the Torah.

Zissu also maintained good relations with regime politicians and, also in 1938, was appointed manager of the National Sugar Trust. In 1939, he was manager of an oil company, Compania Română de Petrol, owning 50% of its stock; he was demoted to its financial adviser in 1940. The period also brought questions about his wealth. In July 1938, the Romanian Consul General in Berlin, Constantin Karadja, argued that Romania had an interest in protecting Zissu's German properties, which could then be sold and used as taxable income in Romania. After the start of World War II, the elder Zissus briefly relocated to neutral Switzerland. Theodore remained in Britain, and actively involved himself with the Jewish movement in Palestine. He testified before the Woodhead Commission and campaigned for the inclusion of Negev in the Jewish colonization zone. Theodore then became a Lieutenant in the Royal Armoured Corps, and was killed in action during the Second Battle of El Alamein.

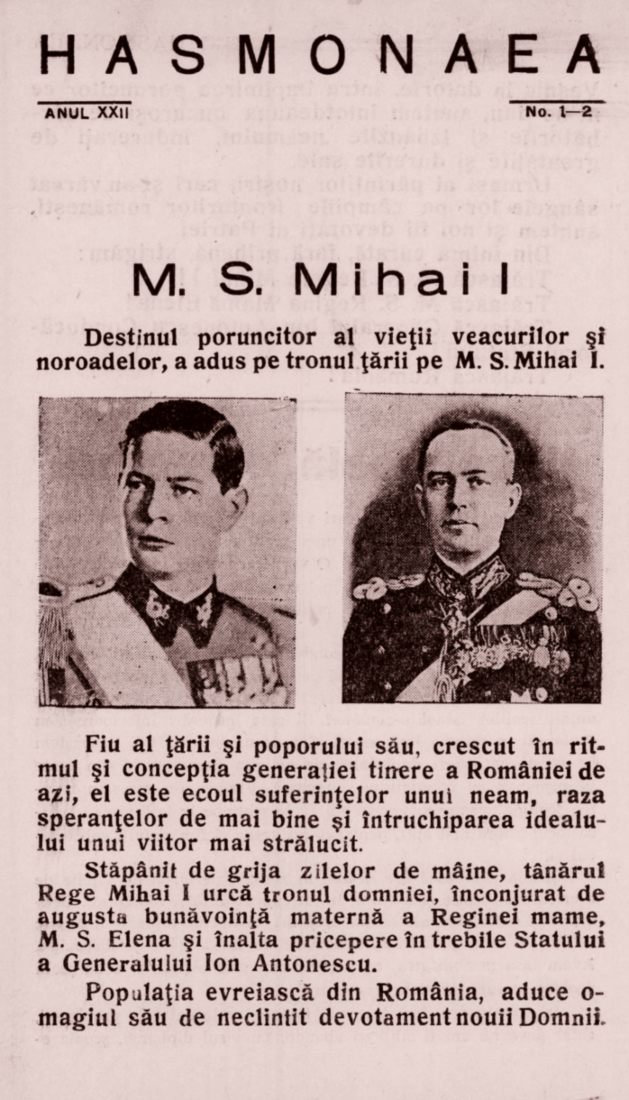
1940 issue of Hasmonaea, congratulating King Michael I and Ion Antonescu for their seizure of power, on behalf of Romania's Jewish population

From late 1940, Romania was ruled upon by Ion Antonescu, who proceeded to uphold antisemitic laws, originally as a partner of the Iron Guard. Unusually, Zissu managed to preserve his estate, including an eponymous restaurant, which was Bucharest's "most selective"; it was located on Batiștei Street, just north of University Square. He was also allowed to continue working for the Sugar Trust, as a sales manager. Surviving the pogrom of January 1941, he remained a prominent but controversial figure in his persecuted community, sponsoring his increasingly hostile friend Sebastian. Sebastian described Zissu as "honest but uninteresting", and his wife as a "perfect example of a Jewish parvenue." He also found Zissu's Zionism unpalatable: "[he is] a theorist of full-blown Jewish nationalism who goes out every evening to a cinema or restaurant, two months after a pogrom." The Jewish poet-activist Meir Rudich suggests that such verdicts are "off-putting [...] but unfortunately true". As argued by Glass, Sebastian's characterization is partial, and fails to cover the basics of Zissu's wartime activity; likewise, critic Marcel Marcian notes that Sebastian "despised A. L. Zissu, though there were things he should have leaned from him".

Zissu found himself at odds with the Antonescu dictatorship, which announced plans to deport Romania's Jews into Transnistria. Sebastian wrote that Zissu and his family initially considered emigrating to Palestine via Turkey, and spent "hundreds of thousands of lei" on obtaining visas. Eventually, however, Zissu chose to partake in a collective effort to protect the Jewish community at large. From November 1941, he was directly involved in obtaining safe passage for the MV Struma, but may have done so for an exorbitant profit: as reported by Jewish passengers who lodged complaints with the Romanian authorities, he charged as much as 600 thousand lei per person, and avoided paying taxes.

==== Resistance movement ====
Also in November 1941, Zissu reestablished contacts with the Jewish communist painter M. H. Maxy, whom he had first befriended while collecting art in the 1930s. Maxy tried to get him to establish a supervisory body called Sfatul Evreiesc (the "Jewish Council"), alongside Filderman; Zissu agreed, but Filderman did not. According to Sebastian, Zissu claimed to have voluntarily divested from Romanian oil, and thus to have "ruined himself", because the industry was catering to the German war machine—Sebastian dismissed the claim as "cheap theater". At around that time, Zissu also became close friends with Franz Babinger, the Bavarian historian and Wehrmacht Colonel. He described Babinger as "a fanatic anti-Nazi and a friend of the English."

By 1942, Zissu had come into conflict with the Central Jewish Office (CE), a sort of Romanian Judenrat created by Antonescu and Radu Lecca. He had in fact been Lecca's first pick as CE president, but their negotiations never led anywhere. He subsequently stood out one of the most vocal Jewish critics of the CE, rejecting all collaboration—a stance also embraced by Călugăru and Ury Benador. With his assimilationist rival Filderman and Chief Rabbi Alexandru Șafran (who mediated between them), he finally set up Sfatul Evreiesc, which now coordinated anti-CE efforts. Zissu quelled his animosity and began corresponding with Filderman, acknowledging his "remarkable skills" and "impressive energy", but still reproaching him his "doctrinal and conceptual sins". He presented himself as the Jews' "spiritual guide" and "seismograph", suggesting that Filderman could remain their "political representative". Filderman eventually put a stop to the exchange of letters, after Zissu asked him to resign and recognize him as the sole representative of their community. Zissu later claimed that Șafran also endorsed Filderman's resignation, but to no effect.

In September 1942, Zissu, Filderman and Carol Reiter played a part in persuading Antonescu and Lecca not to send Banat's Jews to a likely death at Majdanek. Also around that time, Zissu publicly declared the CE leader, Henric Streitman, who had allegedly asked him to contribute money for Antonescu, to be a renegade of the Jewish people. Consequently, he was sacked from his position as state financial adviser and imprisoned for two months at Târgu Jiu's camp for political opponents, where Sebastian visited him. According to his later depositions, Zissu joined the "internees' resistance movement", sabotaging the collection of funds for soldiers while redirecting money toward inmates slated for deportation into Transnistria. It was also in Târgu Jiu that Zissu first learned of his son's death under the British flag. Upon his release, he was placed under watch by the Romanian Police. In early 1943, he was included on a list of Jewish hostages who had to account for their whereabouts with the authorities (in his case, those of Bucharest's 4th Police Precinct).

During mid-1943, the Rescue Committee of the Jewish Agency appointed Zissu as its Romanian liaison and leader of the local Palestine Office, which sparked controversy throughout the community, who supported another Zionist, Mișu Benvenisti. Glass wrote that Zissu "was universally respected, but had the reputation of an extremist who could jeopardize the Zionist movement and the Jewish populace." Zissu confessed his dislike for Benvenisti, seeing him as a parvenu and a Streitman collaborator. Benvenisti reports that Zissu took over with the help of a younger Zionist, Jean Cohen. Cohen informed others that Zissu would be best positioned to direct the efforts of parachutists from Palestine, who were sent in to train local Jewish paramilitaries. They also embarked on a long conflict with the Jewish left, embodied by the Ihud group, who had previously controlled the Romanian Rescue Committee. Zissu audited boos kept by the Palestine Office manager, Shlomo Entzer, allegedly prompting the latter to flee Romania; he allowed another Ihud man, Rubin, to take over for Entzer, but found that he was similarly taking bribes, and went public with the information.

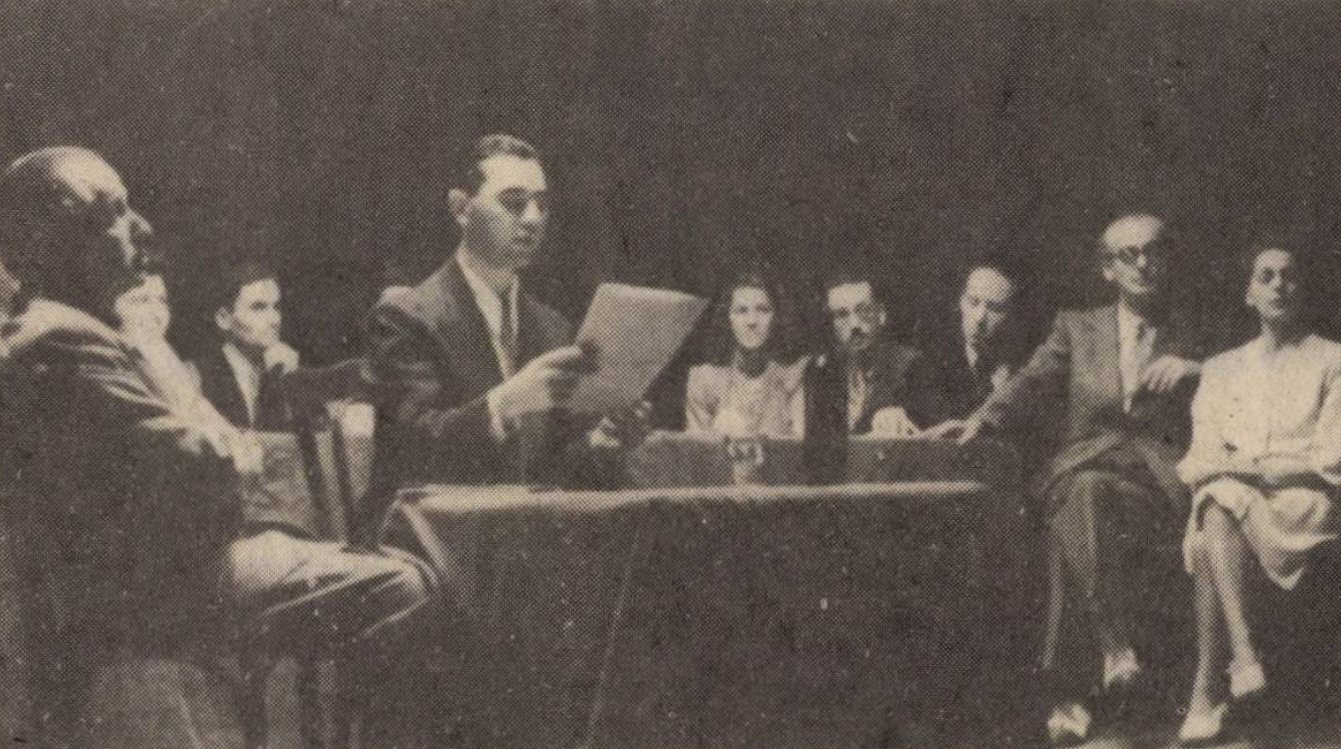
A Jewish literary gathering at the Barașeum Theater in Bucharest, 1943. Zissu (seated at the table, on the left) alongside a young man, possibly Dinu Hervian. In the background, from the left: actress Beate Fredanov; diarist Emil Dorian; poet Nina Cassian; poet Sașa Pană; two men (one of whom is journalist Horia Liman); poet Maria Banuș

At Târgu Jiu, Zissu had met General Nicolae Rădescu, a supporter of the Allies and therefore an Antonescu critic. Also liberated in late 1942, Rădescu was planning to defect; he asked Zissu to provide him with details on the political standing and demands of the Romanian Jewry, which he was to include in his political program for a government-in-exile. Though Rădescu's plan failed to materialize, his contacts with Zissu were criticized by Jean Cohen: "I was aware of Rădescu's antisemitic views, as well as of his not representing any political force or aspiration of the people". In his later depositions, Zissu confirmed that, in 1943, he and Benvenisti, alongside Cornel Iancu, were looking into "illegally reestablishing" the PER. He also recalled having ensured contacts between the underground Romanian Communist Party and Iuliu Maniu, chairman of the more traditional National Peasants' Party (PNȚ), hoping to establish the unified opposition to Antonescu's rule. According to these records, he did so as a favor to his communist friend Maxy. The Siguranța stepped in to stop that collaboration, and Zissu, together with Octav Livezeanu, was again ordered to show up for regular interrogation at police headquarters.

==== Jewish wartime leadership ====
In January 1944, with Benvenisti under temporary arrest, Zissu took control of the Jewish emigration and self-help movement, establishing the Zionist Executive. According to Cohen, this was a "revolutionary" act, whereby Zissu submitted all Zionist organizations under his unique command. Only "one or two" groups expressed objections, fearing that "his political extremism, as they called it, may expose the whole movement, and perhaps the whole Jewish population, to serious dangers." As a representative of "national Judaism in all its categories", he also joined the Central Committee of the Jewish Democratic Front, established by Maxy—who was also envoy of the "Jewish communists". Wilhelm Filderman represented the UER, while Leon Ghelerter and Poldi Filderman were delegates of the Social Democratic Party; the sixth member, Arnold Schwefelberg, was mandated by the Jewish social welfare bodies. According to Zissu's own claims, he and Benvenisti were directing 1 million lei a month toward the underground communists, represented by Maxy and Alexandru Lăzăreanu; half of these went to the International Red Aid. He alleges that any such efforts were weakened by Șafran, who turned out to be "a great hypocrite and a coward."

Reportedly, Lecca used Șafran and Wilhelm Filderman's testimonies as evidence that Zissu was not a trusted figure in the community, and further contended that he was an "English spy". During those months, as the Axis alliance slowly disintegrated, Zissu reached a stalemate with both Lecca and the CE's Nandor Gingold. Lecca now awarded him recognition, and allowed him to carry on with the emigration project in exchange for bribes. The Antonescu regime even proposed that he replace Gingold as CE manager, but Zissu stated his refusal, calling the institution a "bureau of the Gestapo", and accusing Gingold of "high treason". In 1943, the regime was persuaded by Renașterea to give Jewish orphans stranded in Transnistria a free pass to leave for Palestine. Allegedly, Zissu had played an important part in the deal, persuading the regime's Deputy Premier, Mihai Antonescu. Aware of the officials' interest in negotiating a separate peace with the Allies, and their interest in finding "a partial alibi for their crimes against the Jews", Zissu pushed them to accept mass emigration, and effectively made emigration Romania's own solution to the "Jewish Question".

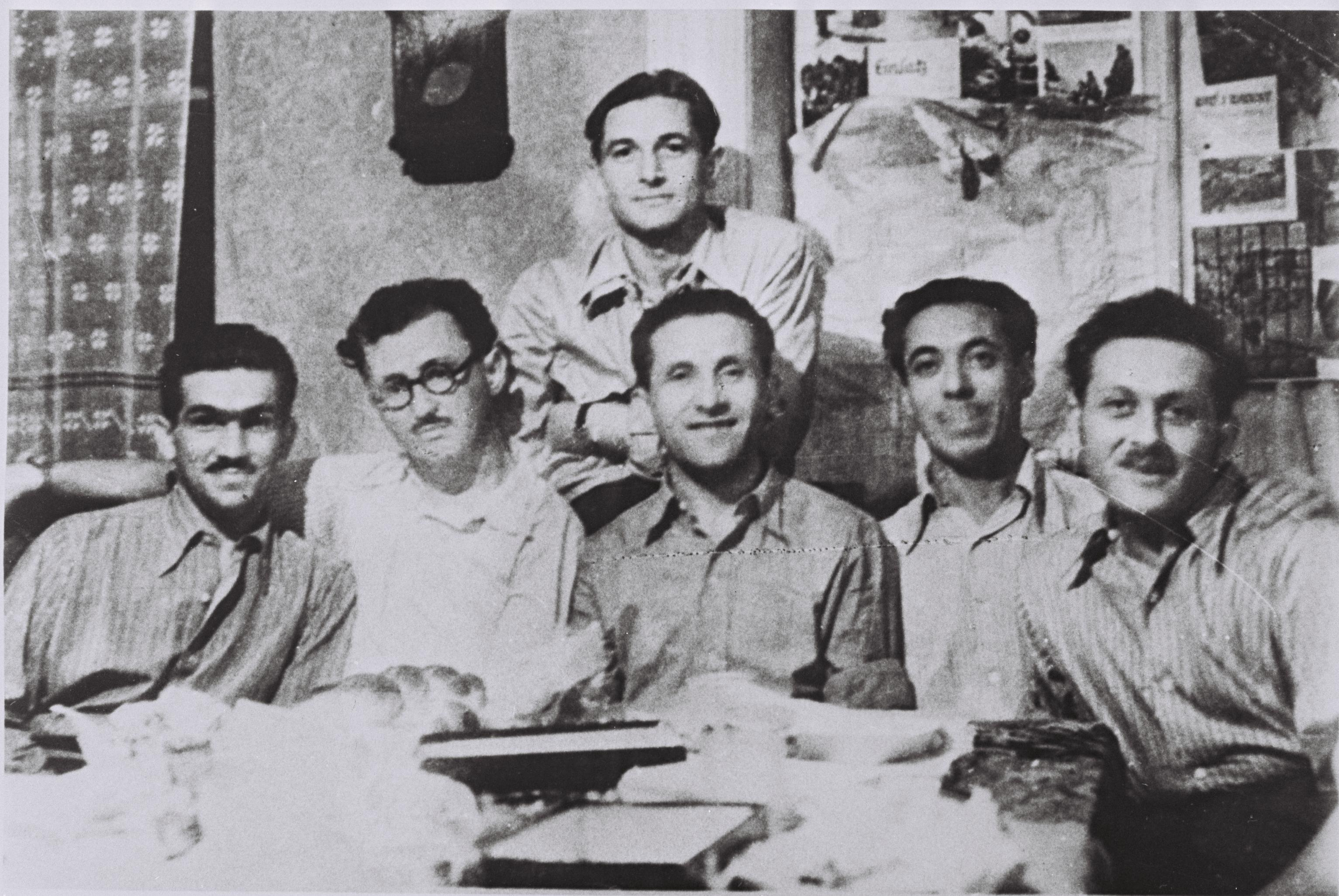
Group of Jewish parachutists, photographed in Bucharest in September 1944. Shaike Dan Trachtenberg is center, seated, with Baruch Kamin to his left

Zissu's agenda pitted him against other relief organizers. He claimed that Pastor Richard Wurmbrand had kidnapped "three or five children" from an orphanage for Transnistrian survivors, and that he himself stepped in to have them returned. Filderman and Zissu had quarreled again before March 1944. They each preserved their own channels of communication with the Romanians and Allies who talked peace in Cairo. Zissu also had a long-standing conflict with the Greek freighter Yannos Pandelis, who organized sea transports to Palestine. Like Filderman, he accused Pandelis of extorting Romanian Jews, and obtained official approval for his ouster. In the process, Zissu exposed shady dealings between Lecca and Pandelis: the former reserved special seats on the departing ships, possibly intended for his CE accomplices. He appeared before an Antonescu government panel which acknowledged the seriousness of the scandal and recognized the Rescue Committee as the prime authority, effectively legalizing emigration.

Zissu believed that, with his network of Jewish "favorites", Lecca had attempted to plant the Gestapo in Palestine. In the end, the two sides agreed that the alleged spies would not be sent over, though Zissu was also coerced into contributing 75 million lei to a charity run by Maria Antonescu. In mid-1944, Mihai Antonescu boasted his defense of Filderman and Zissu's line on emigration, against notes of protest from both Joachim von Ribbentrop and Amin al-Husseini. According to historian Dalia Ofer, he could now count this younger Antonescu as a friend—since Antonescu was "the chief Rumanian proponent of disengagement from Germany, whose position steadily improved as the notion of an Axis victory faded." After ousting Pandelis "out of fundamentally positive motives", Zissu took over as head of the Romanian Red Cross emigration committee, in direct contact with the Rescue Committee's Mossad LeAliyah Bet and Shaul Meirov. Mossad agents found him to be a belligerent egoist and an obstacle to the success of Zionism. Rudich similarly noted that Zissu greatly enjoyed the attention he got from "the Antonescus", as well as from the lesser officials, and that such "pride" was hampering actual emigration efforts. However, Zissu was held in high esteem by those who reached Palestine, and this impressed the Rescue Committee.

Tensions emerged during May 1944, when Bulgaria intercepted and arrested several of the Mossad's vessels, which threatened the Zionist project in its entirety. Zissu's radicalism in this time of crisis led the Yishuv sponsors to parachute in Shaike Dan Trachtenberg, whose mission was to instill discipline among Romanian Zionists and non-Zionists. Filderman was brought in by Meirov to supervise Zissu's initiatives, the Mossad being largely unaware of their irreconcilable differences. Filderman fought against his rival's decision to prioritize the ships for Zionist families while Jews of other convictions were pushed back. In late July, the Mossad concluded that Zissu's contacts with the Antonescu government had little strategic value, and Haim Barlas informed him that the Rescue Committee no longer considered him its representative. Having secured Trachtenberg's support, Zissu fought against this decision, and threatened that the entire Zionist Executive would leave with him.

==== August coup ====
Cohen recounts that Zissu was persuaded by Chaim Weizmann of the World Jewish Congress (WJC) to adopt a more generic strategy, which implied assisting with the survival of Jews from various other areas of German-occupied Europe. By early August 1944, Zissu and the Mossad were again collaborating on the rescue of Hungarian Jews escaping the Holocaust. As reported by Cohen, he and Ion Vinea contacted Pamfil Șeicaru, editor of Curentul newspaper, who pleaded with Ion Antonescu and his ministers that the refugees be allowed safe passage. Șeicaru warned Antonescu that failing to mend the Holocaust guilt could only aggravate sanctions against Romania at a future peace conference. Arie Hirsch, at the time a Zionist youth assisting from Turda, argued that Zissu took personal responsibility for the 2,000 Jewish refugees already arriving in from Northern Transylvania. As reported by Hirsch, Zissu played upon the dictator's patriotism, suggesting that returning formerly Romanian Jews to the Kingdom of Hungary would have implicitly meant recognizing the loss of Northern Transylvania.

Zissu's own account diverges from these details. He notes that crucial assistance came from Swiss envoy René de Weck, together with whom he persuaded Mihai Antonescu not to carry out any shootings at the border. The refugees were to be held at Târgu Jiu, whence Zissu would take them to Palestine. Zissu and Cohen recall that Benvenisti unwittingly jeopardized the plan, when he showed up for direct talks with Lecca without consulting other Jewish leaders. The Hungarian rescue effort was ultimately tolerated by Ion Antonescu, on condition that no refugees would be allowed to linger in Romania-proper; also on Zissu's behalf, Șeicaru contacted Bukovina's Governor, Corneliu Dragalina, who promised to protect Holocaust survivors in Cernăuți. According to later records partly corroborated by Cohen, Zissu viewed his contacting Dragalina as futile, its only result being that Șeicaru, a "notorious fascist and antisemite", had taken 5,000 Swiss francs for his services. Instead, Zissu took credit for stopping a false-flag operation by the Germans, who intended to plant weapons among the Jewish graves in Filantropia cemetery, and use this as a pretext for another pogrom. In all, Zissu claimed to have personally rescued some 14,000 of his coreligionists by obtaining them safe passage to Turkey. He is also credited with having sent over seven individual transports, of which the Mefküre was torpedoed in the Black Sea. Zissu was reportedly persuaded that the sinking of the Mefküre was carried out by the Germans, who knew that it carried six officials of the Polish Underground State—this runs contrary to reports which implicate the Soviet Navy.

Zissu was approached by the regime on August 22, 1944, that is two say two days after the beginning of a Soviet invasion in eastern Romania. Ion Antonescu, who faced the prospect of a full Soviet occupation upon his surrender, asked Zissu to contact the American Jewish Joint Distribution Committee and, through it, the Western Allies, urging for some Anglo–American guarantees. Various authors argue that Zissu agreed to comply, and that he and sent the Joint his letter early on August 23. The interpretation is contradicted by both Zissu and Cohen, who note that the relevant part of this correspondence had already been performed by Filderman, and that Zissu did not intend to antagonize the Soviets. Zissu's impressions of the meeting were recorded on the spot by his colleagues Ernő Marton and Leon Itzacar. According to this testimony, Zissu met a "very pale" Mihai Antonescu and his secretary, Ovidiu Vlădescu. The latter invoked Zissu's patriotism, as a political representative of the Jewish population. Just hours later, Antonescu was deposed in a palace coup, and Romania capitulated to the Allies. On August 24, a General Jewish Council was convened in Ghelerter's home, with Cohen as Zissu's stand-in. Maxy showed up as an envoy of the Red Aid (now dubbed Apărarea Patriotică), and called for mobilizing Jews to defend Bucharest against the Nazi counteroffensive. As Cohen argues, the appeal was "pointless", since Maxy had no weapons to distribute.

During the democratic episode that followed, Zissu re-founded the Jewish Party, and became its president on September 18, 1944. Mântuirea also reappeared that month, as the weekly organ of Romania's Zionist federation, bringing in new talents such as Isidore Isou, while Zissu also reactivated the national chapter of the WJC. During October, he and Marton were particularly invested in obtaining Romanian government protection for Jewish Transylvanians, whom the Arrow Cross Government was in the process of deporting to Nazi extermination camps. Foreign Minister Grigore Niculescu-Buzești supported the effort, and, on October 25, publicized a statement demanding the release of all such Jewish deportees; Zissu and Marton asked for additional guarantees, proposing that the Germans and Hungarians of Romania be treated as hostages, and subjected to a population exchange. Zissu also returned as managing director of his own publishing house, Editura Bicurim, known for its translations from Jewish literary classics. Although the Zionist movement experienced a resurgence, Zissu's Hasidic discourse and disdain for secularism soon drove away younger activists, including Isou. On December 23, 1944, F. Brunea-Fox issued his first-hand account of the 1941 pogrom, as Orașul Măcelului ("City of Slaughter"). It carried a preface by Zissu, which, reviewers noted, was written as a satirical piece against the Iron Guard. Zissu also involved himself in the public denunciation of Gingold and other CE men.

=== Against communism ===
==== Zissu and the CED ====
According to historian Lucian Nastasă, Zissu "hoped for a truly democratic change in Romania, as the one chance for Jews to obtain citizenship rights." Zionist Joseph Klarman contrarily noted, in October 1944, that Zissu wanted immediate mass emigration to Palestine, to the point of rejecting international aid for Jews stranded in Romania. Zissu, Benvenisti, Cohen and Marton all approached Maniu and the PNȚ for talks to end racial policies. As Cohen noted, Maniu defended antisemitic measures, since they advanced economic Romanianization, and alleged that too many Jews were natural affiliates of communism. From December 1944 to March 1945, Zissu's former co-conspirator, General Rădescu, served as Prime Minister of Romania. Zissu visited him to obtain a dispensation for Jews from conscription into the Romanian Army, until such time as the last antisemitic laws were formally overturned. Alongside Pál Benedek, he issued international appeals to obtain humane treatment and legal protection for Jewish Transylvanians. Adamantly anti-communist while the country experienced gradual communization (after Rădescu's ouster), he mapped out a two-stage plan for his community: obtaining recognition for the Jews as a distinct ethnic minority; in the long run, mass emigration to Palestine. This policy was rejected outright by the governing Communist Party and Gheorghe Vlădescu-Răcoasa, the Minister for Minorities, who refused to award ethnic recognition to the Jews.

Although Mântuirea was being put out from the same offices as the central communist daily Scînteia, Zissu and Benvenisti spoke out against the communist-controlled Jewish Democratic Committee (CDE), arguing that it was neither democratic nor Jewish. This episode followed a breakdown of negotiations between Zissu and Iosif Ebercohn, of the PER, and the CDE—represented by Iosif Șraier. While coordinating a CDE meeting in October 1945, the Communist Party's Vasile Luca identified both Zissu and Filderman as "very dangerous" enemies, who "never tire of besmirching Romanian democracy like it's some kind of fascist dictatorship." The clash also brought Zissu into another conflict with Filderman, who supported the CDE as a pragmatic measure, fearing that "otherwise the government will view the [Jewish] community as a reactionary element", resulting in "thousands of Jews [being] sent to Siberia". Meanwhile, Zissu's own refusal to cooperate with the Romanian Red Cross in organizing transports to Palestine infuriated the Mossad and the Yishuv, who demanded that he step down from the Zionist Executive. He ultimately did so in autumn 1945, leaving the Executive to be controlled by Bernard Rohrlich. In his clashes with Rohrlich, Zissu noted that the WJC had come to share his and Ze'ev Jabotinsky's assumptions about Palestine. Reviewing this argument, Zionist polemicist Ben Israel compared Zissu to a village idiot always set on arguing for the same solution; he also noted that Zissu "is all too absorbed by his polemics across the globe".

Cohen claims that, as early as 1945, the WJC and the Ihud endorsed an forced merger of the UER and the PER under Filderman's chairmanship, with Zissu relegated to honorary president of the consolidated body; at the local chapter of the WJC, Zissu was to share his functions with Tivadar Fischer. The plan only fell apart because Zissu and Cohen were still in a position to veto it. The Ihud interrupted contacts with the Jewish Party, and soon after adhered to the CDE platform. Zissu called this a "grave sin toward the national idea and toward Jewish honor". He then found that his anti-CDE boycott was questioned from within the party by Benvenisti, who also garnered support from Rohrlich and Ebercohn. In November 1945, the CDE itself claimed that Zissu was intending to form a "consolidated front of the right", and had reignited "intrigues" to bring Ihud men back into the fold.

On July 7, 1946, the PER voted itself a new leadership committee: Ebercohn, Wilhelm Fischer, Doctor Harschfeld, Cornel Iancu, Itzacar, Sami Iakerkaner, Edgar Kanner, M. Rapaport, Rohrlich, Leon Rozenberg, Tully Rosenthal, and Isaia Tumarkin. Disappointed with these setbacks, Zissu renounced all his official functions in mid-1946, stepping down as PER president on July 21. In a 1951 interrogation, he asserted that, ever since the CDE's creation, he was persuaded him that "centrifugal organizations will not be authorized by government." He claimed to have happily resigned, "eluding burdens and worries that I had never sought"; his main activity thereafter was to translate his earlier literary works into Hebrew. He was reportedly asked to appear as a defense witness during Mihai Antonescu's trial by the Romanian People's Tribunal, but failed to show up.

At around that time, Zissu publicly expressed the belief that "the antisemitic hobbyhorse will be taken out of the ill-reputed capitalist stable, and led into the brand new one, that of revolution." The communized Siguranța began keeping new taps on him, noting his closeness to Betar, his alleged corruption, and his covert support for Zionist political violence while under formal British protection. In fact, Zissu resented the policies of Foreign Secretary Ernest Bevin, and especially his commitment to the White Paper of 1939, which still restricted Jewish settlement in Palestine. He claimed that the British Legation sought to buy him off with a passport to Palestine in 1946, also noting that Filderman, a committed Anglophile, had been tempted to accept that same type of gift. Cohen records that his mentor's "stiff opposition" to the WJC leadership was also in answer to their policy of "placating England". Upon the start of civil war in Palestine, Zissu refused to receive any British awards, and his Mântuirea articles became so harshly anti-British that they had to be censored. Upon Zissu's advice, Cohen also returned a British certificate attesting his role in wartime resistance.

==== 1946–1947 concealment ====
Zissu's departure enshrined a left-wing domination of the Zionist movement, which was now split between the CDE and the Ihud. At the time, Maxy, who had taken over as CDE leader, publicly accused his former friend Zissu of being a reactionary element and a Siguranța informant. In August 1945, the CDE volunteered to the Siguranța a "Table of relevant Jewish organizations on Bucharest's Municipal Territory". It listed Zissu for his activities at the WJC, noting that both he and Benvenisti were "centrist" opponents of the communist line; this contrasted with its assessments of Jewish politicians such as Filderman and Marco Prezente, who were listed as "neutral". Late that year, Zissu was questioning the communist theses on "wrecking" by industrial saboteurs, noting that such incidents could not account for market shortages. Scînteia viewed his comments as "characteristically naive". Other communist sources alleged that Zissu had been a Gestapo man, citing as proof his Grunewald villa and his friendship with Babinger, and that he was a sponsor of the "fascist" Betar.

In an interview with Agerpres published just before the general election of 1946, Zissu "expresses his chagrin that the Jewish party never managed to present its own lists", but "urges all members of this party to vote for the government lists." Also then, the CDE's candidates presented him as their ally, noting that Jewish unity had been achieved around communism. His polemical essay, titled Nu există cult mozaic ("No Such Thing as a Mosaic Religion"), came out in March 1947. It was his definitive answer to Vlădescu-Răcoasa, and repeated the beliefs he first stated in the 1920s, that Judaism "may be considered a race, a nation, an idea, a vision of existence, a tragedy, a permanent universal digression, but it is definitely not a religious denomination." He contended that, over the centuries, rabbis had preferred to emulate Christian priesthood, and had done so "for material gain." His anticlericalism was again illustrated—this time, by articles in Mântuirea, which specifically targeted Șafran. His stance alienated his friends Cohen and Itzacar, who had formed a Klal-Zionist Party of Romania; also in 1947, Klal took control of the publication and obtained that Zissu lose all his editorial privileges.

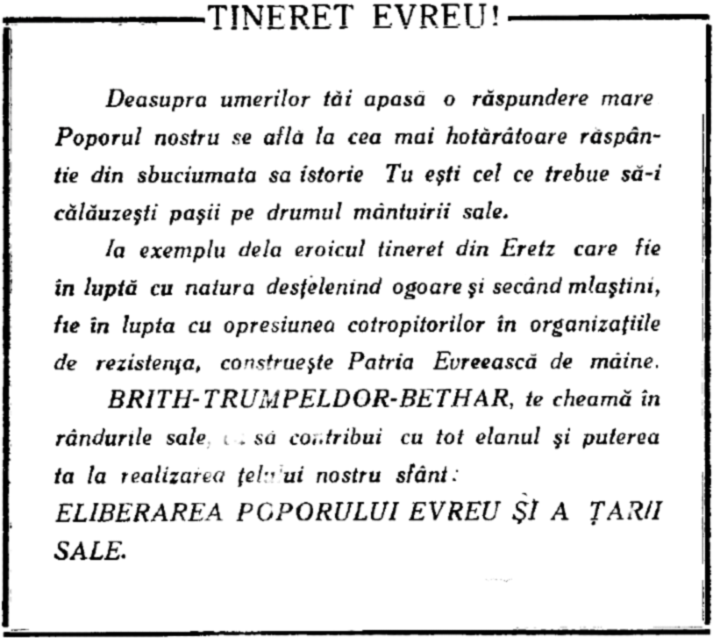
March 1947 playbill for a Betar benefit in Roman, urging Jewish youths to mobilize for the colonization effort in Palestine (called Eretz and Patria Evreească de mâine, "Tomorrow's Jewish Homeland")

Filderman offered to take Zissu out of the country with a transport set up by the Joint Distribution Committee. Zissu allegedly rejected that offer because the Joint had "turned Jews into a heap of cadgers". He also recalls shunning a similar offer made by Itzacar: "there's a thousand reasons why I'm not interested". Meanwhile, Filderman's UER had been taken over by the pro-communist Moise Zelțer-Sărățeanu. The latter joined hands with the CDE, and launched an ideological attack against Zissu. The authorities were testing some forms of repression against Zissu and his movement, which centered on confiscating their assets—including Zissu's factories. Unable to support himself, the Zionist leader attempted an escape from the country, but was captured in Timișoara and had to spend three months in the local jail. He returned to civilian life as a tutor of Hebrew, but, as he put in his April 1948 letter to Teohari Georgescu, the communist Minister of the Interior, he mainly lived from selling his remaining property. Zissu demanded that Georgescu allow him to leave Romania, since:

I have no income, I'm not in the workforce. [...] I'm not equipped to learn a new trade to get by on it. My skills as a former industrial assets manager are presently unusable, and as a writer and journalist I'm no longer in tune with this era, nor in line with its imperatives.

Cohen notes that, in late 1947, Zissu had embarked on a collaboration with Rădescu, who had escaped to the United States and was leading the Romanian National Committee (RNC). Preparing for the possibility of an American–Soviet hot war, he considered the RNC a legitimate government, who could extend its protection to the Romanian Jews. In early 1948, Romania was brought under a fully-fledged communist regime. Shortly after, Zissu resigned from the WJC, though the latter continued to seek his collaboration as an informer. Late that year, on the initiative of Iancu Mendelovici, he and Cohen sketched out a plan to collect funds for victims of the postwar pogroms—the project also drew support from two former PNȚ-ists, namely Gheorghe Zane and Emil Hațieganu, prompting the regime to investigate.

==== Sfatul Sionist and "Biblical socialism" ====
By 1949, Zissu had entered the clandestine opposition movement against communism, attempting to reestablish the old emigration network. He formed a conspiratorial group called Sfatul Sionist (the "Zionist Council"), on which he co-opted Cohen, Ebercohn, Mendelovici, Rohrlich, and Schwefelberg. The latter remained an ardent socialist of "very advanced social conceptions"; his daughter, Veronica Porumbacu, was a noted communist poet. Zissu received only minimal support from Israeli officials, who found his project too risky; he also vetoed any collaboration with Filderman and the Joint, though both Schwefelberg and Cohen now supported it. Instead, he and his Sfatul were closely monitored by the communist secret police, now reorganized as the Securitate. Securitate operatives such as Andrei Niculescu Brentano and the Jewish officer Condrea were initially ordered to approach Zissu and obtain from him a full list of Jews who had signed up for emigration. They presented themselves as envoys of the Politburo, and assured him that his collaboration would ensure safe passage for Romania's Jews.

As part of the ruse, Niculescu arranged contacts between Zissu and some lesser officials, including Minister of Labor Lothar Rădăceanu, who offered to traffic in Jews, but only in exchange for "strategic supplies". Zissu was thus deluded into providing the authorities with the records they needed. Still unaware of the implications, Zissu requested a meeting with the communist General Secretary, Gheorghe Gheorghiu-Dej, asking him to approve of his emigration project. In September 1948, Simion Schwartz, a Jewish worker at Nicolae Cristea Rolling Mills, described Zissu and Filderman as "capitalist Jews who were just as adept as exploiting their workers as the non-Jewish capitalists."

Zissu was initially arrested in 1949, with the Securitate invested in obtaining his submission. One report suggests that his captors, unaware that Zissu's son was dead, presented him with a forged letter supposedly sent by Theodore, which described the advantages of collaborating with the authorities. Shortly after this incident, Zissu began corresponding with Israel's Foreign Minister, Moshe Sharett, to inform him that the communists were preparing to clamp down on Romanian Zionism—a tip Zissu had received from Cohen. He proposed that Sharett grant him a diplomatic posting for Israel, which would have forced the Romanian government to strip him of his citizenship. Zissu was still cautiously dissociating himself from Sharett's radical leftist party (the Mapai), and overall from Israel's Labor Zionism: "although a socialist, I'm not a Marxist, so, though I were to receive a diplomatic commission for Israel from his Marxist hands, I should hope to be serving only the state". He dreamed of forming a "Biblical socialist party" upon his resettlement into the Jewish state—he now taught that dialectical materialism was opposed to Jewish ethics, though social ownership was not. Zionist Moți Moscovici recounts that, "at some point in 1947–1948", Zissu had completed a manuscript of the same name (Socialismul Biblic), and was reading from it to his friends.

In July 1950, the Romanian communist regime openly embarked on anti-Zionist and anti-cosmopolitan campaigns, arresting waves of Jewish nationalists and nonconformists. Zissu joined Zalman Rabinsohn, brother of the Communist Party politico Ana Pauker and a returnee from Israel, trying to find sympathetic ears in the party leadership. They received a blunt reply and a warning from Iosif Chișinevschi, who allegedly told Rabinsohn that antisemitism had been liquidated from the country, and that Romania sided with the Arab League. That year, Iosif Bercu published a brochure which alleged that:

the 'big Zionists' have all worked with the German fascists [...]. A. L. Zissu, for example, who was the president of the Zionist organization for many years, stayed in Berlin during the war and made deals with the Hitlerites.

==== At Jilava ====
In the meantime, Zissu's old friend Reuven Rubin, who was serving as Israel's first ambassador in Bucharest, tried to redress Zissu's fortunes. He asked Zissu to write a monograph "on the Jewish tragedy under the Antonescu government", with financial support from the Jewish Agency for Israel. Zissu rejected the sponsorship, but agreed to start writing it for free, "in Israel, and in the Hebrew language." Upon Rubin's intervention, Sharett sent him a gift of 50,000 lei in April 1951. In his reply, Zissu confirmed that what he actually needed was his own Israeli passport. He also asked Sharett to call on Frédéric Joliot-Curie, who, as a friend of the Romanian communists, might have intervened on Zissu' behalf. Zissu was perfecting his own brand of antimalarial medication, intending to share the patents and profits with the Israeli state, Teva Pharmaceuticals, and the Histadrut. At the time, several branches of his family had emigrated—including those formed by his brothers-in-law Aron Rappaport and Isidor Zimmer, and his brother Ehud Achiazar. As reported by Zissu, Sharett sent a reply through Rubin that "he could not and cannot offer me Israeli citizenship".

Zissu then followed up with displays of radical defiance: he made a public mockery of the Stockholm Peace Appeal, which was being circulated in the Romanian intellectual community, refusing to sign it because he "wanted war". Writer Nicolae Steinhardt, who recounts the incident, admired Zissu as an "insane man breaking his own windows". On May 3 or May 10, 1951, the Securitate arrested Zissu and some 200 of his fellow activists. On May 16, România Liberă informed the public that "the former great industrialist A. L. Zissu of Aurel Vlaicu Street 34" had refused to sign the Peace Appeal. The newspaper claimed that, as one of the "former collaborators with the fascist regime in our country", Zissu was hoping for a return to the "halcyon days when our people was being bled out to enrich a handful of exploiters."

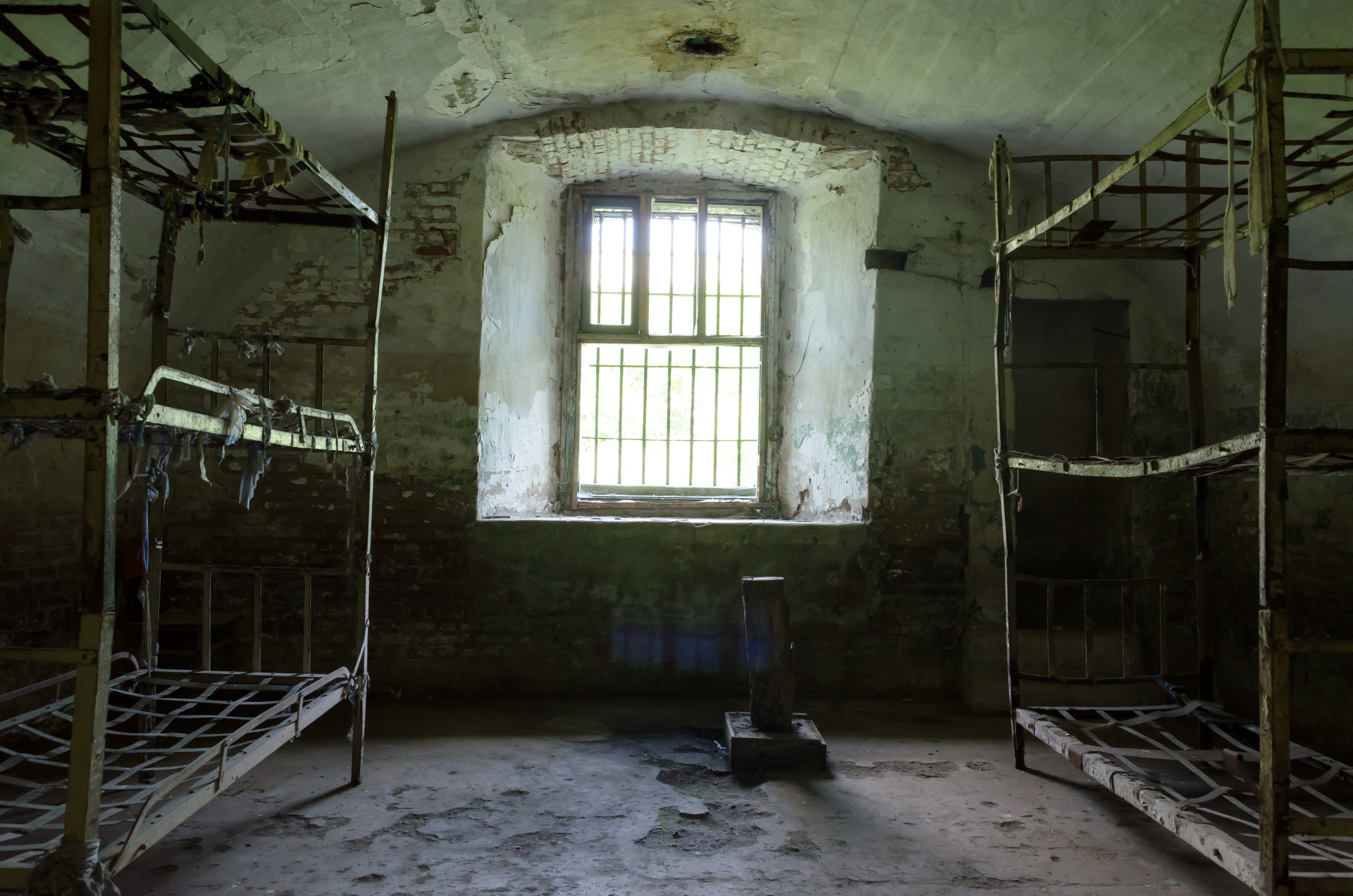
Cell of Jilava Prison, photographed in 2012

Held at Jilava Prison until September 27, 1954, Zissu was initially charged with having provided information on the "political and administrative life" of Communist Romania to the Israeli government. Interrogated throughout his time in Jilava, he was regularly tortured at the hands of Securitate Lieutenant-Major Teodor Micle. As noted by researcher Teodor Wexler, the regime's only solid charge against Zissu was that, along with Ambassador Rubin and Cohen, he had provided material assistance to people already in Securitate custody. Adolf Bleicher, a communist-turned-Zionist, said in 1979 that Zissu had caved in and "[fallen] into the trap they had set for him." For long, Zissu had refused to acknowledge any preordained confession, and made sure to write down and sign all his statements. He also engaged Micle in ideological debates, describing his "Biblical socialism" as rooted in Jewishness and inherently superior to Soviet-type economic planning. His stance antagonized another Zionist prisoner, Menahem Fermo, who later wrote about Zissu being "the most conceited man I ever chanced upon".

On March 12, 1952, possibly after Micle had been allowed to use his most brutal methods on him (and months ahead of Gheorghiu-Dej's clarification that he viewed all Zionists as "agents of Israel"), Zissu confessed that he had been an "inveterate spy"; he also declared that all his previous confessions were therefore incomplete. According to Wexler and Mihaela Popov, nothing corroborates Zissu's spying throughout the 5,000 pages of interrogations. Some three days after this unique confession, Zissu had returned to a more defiant stance, noting that Jewish organizations had no business adhering to the CDE in the absence of any guarantees of Jewish cultural survival.

By February 1953, the inquiry came to implicate Rabinsohn, arrested for his contacts with Zissu, and then Pauker herself, who was deposed by Gheorghiu-Dej and other rivals. Zissu made a point of not implicating people that were still at large; when pressed by Micle to name his accomplices, he mentioned Kiva Orenștein, who had been in prison since 1949. In April 1953, România Liberă published an exposé by Iosif Bercu, which referred to the Zionists as "agents of imperialism". Bercu reminded his readers that: "One of the most rabid Zionist propagandists was the industrialist A. L. Zissu, owner of a sugar factory, who, in 1933–1934, for all the Hitlerist takeover in Germany, casually lived in Berlin, where he ran some very lucrative deals."

==== Sentencing, reprieve, and death ====
Zissu was eventually found guilty of high treason ("conspiracy against the social order") and sentenced to life imprisonment on March 31, 1954. This was a group trial of "thirteen leaders of the Romanian Zionist movement"; life sentences were also handed to Benvenisti and Cohen. The thirteenth defendant was a Swiss Gentile and former Gestapo spy, Charles Philippe Gyr, whom the Securitate had infiltrated into the group "for diversionary purposes." During the proceedings, Zissu lashed out at his co-defendant Benvenisti, whose own interrogation had produced a full confession to all crimes attributed by his captors. As reported by Steinhardt, Zissu told Benvenisti:

This court I shall not recognize, it has no authority over us. But when we'll be together in our own land, there I shall call you out and make sure you get the punishment worthy of such cowardice.

Zissu's wife was not imprisoned, but she was forced out of their apartment, and lived in the hallway. In late September 1954, Abraham was transported by rail to Pitești, alongside his political adversary Rudich. Both were then dispatched to the infamous Pitești Prison, and were reportedly psychologically abused by their guards on arrival. Zissu's case was presented for review in October, but reprieve was ruled out; his regimen in the Pitești facility was by then proving to be exceptionally harsh. Wexler notes that Zissu was one of the test subjects for an experiment in reeducation inaugurated by Eugen Țurcanu and Petrică Fux, namely: "a regimen of political indoctrination under the threat of beatings. A regimen that defies logical reason." That same year, Zissu's colleague Orenștein died as a result of being tortured by Țurcanu, who was acting on orders received from Securitate officer Tudor Sepeanu. Zissu himself was granted an amnesty upon interventions made by Israeli diplomats, being moved to Văcărești Prison in June 1955, and ultimately reprieved on April 14, 1956.

At Văcărești, Zissu was again in contact with Benvenisti and Jean Cohen, but, unlike them, did not generally converse with the Romanian Christians. One of the latter was Radu Sturdza, who nonetheless respected him as "the most esteemed of the Jews, [in that] he never struck any deal with Radu Lecca during the Antonescian period". Upon release, Zissu moved into his old Bucharest home, and was allowed to resume work as manager of his former sugar factory. His health compromised by mistreatment in prison, he became the focus of another campaign, which was meant to ensure his right to emigrate. Chief Rabbi Moses Rosen was among those involved in negotiating the issue with Gheorghiu-Dej's government. He obtained an audience with Deputy Premier Emil Bodnăraș, who was cheerful about granting Zissu and Benvenisti their Romanian passports: "They wish to leave, so Mazal tov!"

Abrahram and Rachel Zissu finally emigrated on July 17, 1956, reaching Vienna first, and then taking an El Al flight to Tel Aviv; they arrived there, alongside Jean Cohen and Moscovici with their families, on the night of July 18. Addressing the small crowd gathered for an impromptu welcome ceremony, Zissu noted that his time in prison, as well as his ultimate arrival in Israel, had solidified his belief in miracles. He was rushed into a hospital, but died of a heart attack in Tel Aviv less than two months after his arrival. Journalist Henry Marcus delivered his obituary, which he had initially prepared as a biographical notice to celebrate Zissu's arrival, over Israel Radio. His funeral was attended by some of Israel's leading figures, among them Golda Meir, Yosef Sprinzak, and the WJC's Nahum Goldmann. Goldmann personally delivered the funeral oration.

== Legacy ==
The writer and activist was further honored by having a Haifa street and an Acre school named after him later in the 1950s; Mella Revici-Iancu also founded a Zissu Library, inaugurated in September 1960 as part of the Israeli Romanian Association (Hitachdut Olei Romania). In December 1963, Libertatea journal, published in Israel by the Romanian Betar, put out a special issue on Zissu, featuring an homage by Theodor Loewenstein-Lavi. Two other Zissu streets exist, one in Tel Aviv and the other in Beersheba. He was also honored in the anti-communist Romanian diaspora, including by those he secretly despised. In 1957, Pamfil Șeicaru published an overview of Zissu's work, referring in particular to his role in rescuing Bukovina's Jews from extermination. In 1989, Alexandru Șafran, the "last survivor among the leaders of Romania's Jewish Community", referred to Zissu, Filderman and Benvenisti as having acted "with belief in the God of Israel and the eternity of the people of Israel as their only comfort."

Romanian reviewers continued to regard Zissu as a minor figure: in 1974 critic Ioan Adam reiterated that Spovedania unui candelabru was undeserving of Arghezi's praise (which had been reprinted as part of Arghezi's collected works). Until the fall of communism in December 1989, extant copies of Nu există cult mozaic and other Zionist books were withdrawn from private use in Romania, and placed alongside fascist works in the most inaccessible fund of public libraries. Zissu's manuscripts, which he wrote down in pencil and sent to be preserved by his friend Joseph Klarman "for editing", were still unpublished at the time of his death. They include essays about Romanian Jews, a novel on the same topic, as well as a number of Yiddish translations of his own work. His memoirs and diaries were collected and revised by Jean Ancel, and published in 2004 by Yad Vashem and Tel Aviv University. According to author Teșu Solomovici, the 125th anniversary of Zissu's birth, nine years later, "went by unnoticed". Upon the 2019 reissue of Manuel sin Marcu (curated by Emil Nicolae), Voncu observed that:

[Zissu's] close rapport with men on the right, including some who were outspoken antisemites, from Nae Ionescu to Mihai Antonescu, has established his rather poor reputation in democratic circles, hence his merits in rescuing thousands of Jews during the Holocaust, as well as in organizing emigration to what would then become the State of Israel, are still not afforded the recognition they deserve.
