= Zvi Magen =

Israeli diplomat

Zvi Magen (Hebrew: צבי מגן; born 1945) is the former deputy head of Nativ, Israeli ambassador to Ukraine in 1993, ambassador to Russia in 1998, and Head of Nativ from 1999 to 2005. Magen wished to retire from his post during the Sharon government, but was convinced to stay until a replacement was found. This search was delayed because of Sharon's coma and Ehud Olmert's ascension but was finally completed in November 2006 when ambassador to Ukraine Naomi Ben-Ami was chosen.
