= Yaakov Kedmi =

Russian-Israeli politician and former head of Nativ

- יעקב קדמי
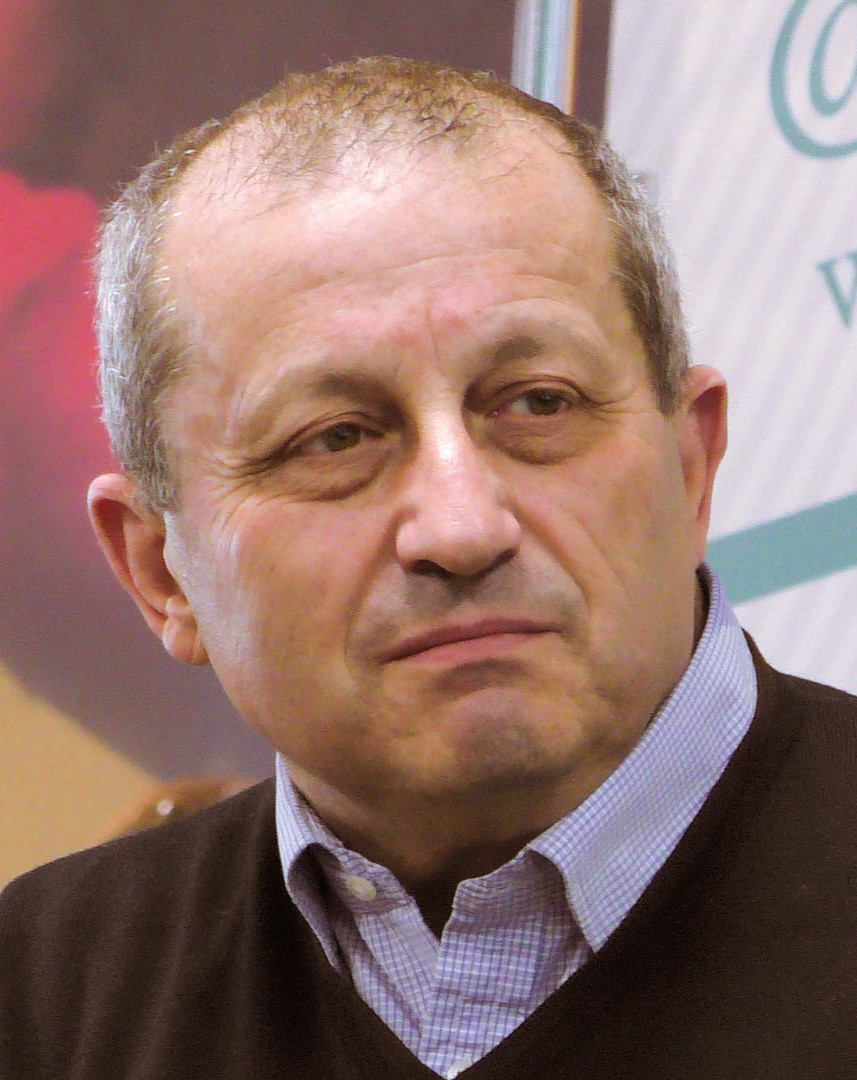
- Born: Yakov Iosifovich Kazakov; 5 March 1947 (age 79); Moscow, Russian SFSR, USSR
- Occupations: Politician, diplomat, propagandist
- Known for: Head of Nativ (1992–1999)
- Children: 3
- Military career
- Allegiance: Israel
- Branch: Israel Defense Forces

Yaakov Kedmi (Hebrew: יעקב קדמי; born 5 March 1947 in Moscow), also known as Yasha Kazakov and Yakov Iosifovich Kazakov (Russian: Яков Иосифович Казако́в) is an Israeli politician and diplomat. He was the head of the Nativ liaison bureau from 1992 to 1999, specializing in the repatriation of Eastern European Jews to Israel.

== Biography ==
=== Early life ===
He was born in Moscow on 5 March 1947 in the family of Iosif Yakovlevich Kazakov and Sofia Yakovlevna Kazakova. He studied at the Moscow Institute of Transport Engineers. He applied for Aliyah in early 1967 at the Israeli embassy in Moscow. Israeli diplomats initially refused as they suspected that he was a KGB agent. After publicly renouncing Soviet citizenship in May 1968, Kedmi, in December of that year, wrote an emotional letter, which was received by Nehemiah Levanon after originally being directed to the Supreme Soviet. In the letter, he expressed pride in his Jewish heritage and declared that he had a right to live in Israeli land. Levanon leaked this letter to The Washington Post, which caused wide coverage to occur in the West and public pressure to mount on the government. As a result, Kedmi received permission to emigrate in February 1969 and eventually he was granted an exit visa.

=== Career in Israel ===
Once he immigrated to Israel, he went by the Hebraicized name Yaakov Kedmi. In Israel, Kedmi continued his studies at the Technion – Israel Institute of Technology in Haifa and the Tel Aviv University. He later served in the Israel Defense Forces. It was here where he met future Prime Minister Ehud Barak, with whom he served during the Yom Kippur War. After the war, he worked at Sohnut's office in Austria and held various positions within the Israeli Foreign Ministry. He was a member of Herut, and in 1978, on the recommendation of the party's leader, joined Nativ. From 1988 to 1990 he was an employee of the Israeli consular group at the Dutch Embassy in Moscow. In 1992, Yitzhak Shamir appointed Kedmi the director of Nativ. After Nativ was deprived of its special status, Kedmi resigned in 1999.

=== Later years ===
In the 21st century, Kedmi became high-profile lecturer in geopolitics, and from 2014 also became a regular participant in various Russian TV shows. He has participated in televised round tables on Russian television supporting pro-Russia position in international political affairs. In November 2016, Kedmi defended Joseph Stalin while on Evening with Vladimir Solovyov. He described Stalin as "the last statesman to take care of his country”. Despite his support for the Russian invasion of Ukraine, he has argued against the Russian position that sees the arms shipments from the West to Ukraine as part of a European war against Russia. He came out in the Russian media against Solovyov's calls for bombing of civilian targets, calling them "obscene". Following the Gaza war in 2023, Kedmi also came out bluntly against the Russian criticism of Israel's war, especially in light of Russia's own war in Ukraine.

According to Kedmi, his words are the expression of his personal opinions, and are part of freedom of expression, and these measures are intended to prevent him from expressing his opinions, being a private citizen who does not make decisions regarding these issues.

== Family ==
His wife is a food chemist who worked for the Ministry of Defense. He has three children: two sons and a daughter.

== Books ==
- Kedmi, Yakov (2011). Безнадёжные войны [Hopeless Wars]. Contento Now. ISBN 978-9655504835.
- Kedmi, Yakov; Satanovsky, Ye. (2017). Диалоги [Dialogues]. Eksmo. ISBN 978-5-699-95068-3.
- Kedmi, Yakov (2020). Тайные пружины [Hidden springs]. Eksmo. ISBN 978-5-04-109828-5.
