= Nehemiah Levanon =

Israeli diplomat

- נחמיה לבנון
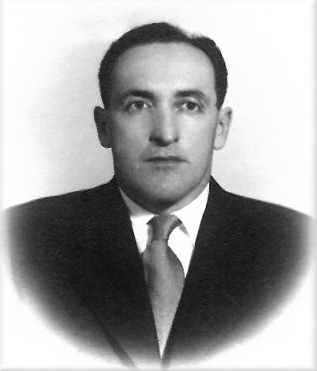
- Born: Niuma Levitan; March 23, 1915; Rujiena, Governorate of Livonia (present-day Latvia)
- Died: September 2, 2003 (aged 88); Kfar Blum, Israel
- Known for: Director of Nativ
- Movement: Labor Zionism

Nehemiah Levanon (Hebrew: נחמיה לבנון; March 23, 1915 – September 2, 2003) was an Israeli intelligence agent, diplomat, head of the aliyah program Nativ, and a founder of kibbutz Kfar Blum. Originally a native of Latvia, he immigrated to the Mandatory Palestine in 1938. After Israel's independence in 1948, Levanon served in a variety of roles to encourage the well-being and emigration of Soviet Jewry. Due to the covert nature of his work, Levanon's decades of service were largely unknown until after his retirement, during the last days of the Soviet Union.

== Early life ==
Niuma Levitan was born in 1915 in Rujiena, Latvia, to Yosef and Bertha Ilion Levitan. Yosef, a candy factory manager, was a native of Šiauliai, Lithuania and a communist revolutionary who fled to Russia during the Russian Revolution; he died during the course of the Russian Civil War. In response to the invasion of Latvia by Germany during World War I, Niuma's sister, mother, grandmother, and other relatives moved to Perm, Russia, and later to Petrograd.

They relocated in 1922 to Tallinn, Estonia (where one of Levitan's aunts lived) with assistance from the American Jewish Joint Distribution Committee, while his grandmother was arranged to sail to America. Levitan became active in the Tallinn Jewish community by singing in the Jewish choir and participating in Jewish youth groups.

He became inspired by a member of Hashomer Hatzair to join the Labor Zionist movement. In 1931, Levitan established a chapter of the socialist Zionist youth movement Netzach, a Hebrew acronym for "Pioneer Zionist Youth." He was active for several years with Netzach, assuming leadership of the Estonian branch in 1933 and the Latvian branch—the movement's largest—by 1937. For part of this time, he received agricultural training and lived on a communal farm near Tallinn.

In 1937, Levitan began making his way to Palestine. He stopped briefly in Vienna to assist local Netzach leaders.

== Aliyah ==
Levitan arrived in Palestine in February 1938 and joined the kibbutz Afikim, near the Sea of Galilee. He and other immigrants (together known as the "Anglo-Baltic kibbutz" due to their lands of birth) moved to the town of Binyamina later that year. A number of the town's agricultural workers were Arabs who quit work or were fired as a result of the Arab rioting happening across Palestine.

A contingent of the Anglo-Baltic group settled in the Hula Valley in 1941 to work lands owned by the Jewish National Fund. In October 1943, Levitan married Beba Levin, a fellow community member who he met years earlier at a summer camp in Latvia. Two weeks later, he laid the cornerstone for kibbutz Kfar Blum. From 1946 to 1948, he acted as an emissary for the Habonim Dror and Hechalutz chapters in London. He returned to Israel in June 1948 to help the Yishuv during the War of Independence.

After the war, he became an administrator of Kfar Blum and managed the kibbutz's economy.

== Soviet Jewry campaign ==
=== Early work ===
The Soviets thought I was interested in raising potatoes. I was interested in raising Jews.

— Nehemiah Levanon, 1970

In 1953, Levitan accepted an invitation from Mossad director Isser Harel to establish contacts in the Soviet Jewish Community. This was part of an effort by a small, new clandestine agency that reported to the Prime Minister's Office. Originally known as "Bilu," it was known by the code name "Nativ" and was officially called Lishkat HaKesher, or the "Liaison Bureau." Levitan changed his name to the more Hebraic-sounding Nehemiah Levanon, as many Israelis did at the time. At the time of his posting, the Soviet Union had broken off diplomatic relations (in response to the 1953 bombing of the Soviet embassy in Tel Aviv). Levanon therefore worked in Sweden until ties were re-established later that year.

Levanon and his family then moved to Moscow, where he disguised his covert activities by working as an agricultural attaché in the Israeli embassy. He told friend Richard Perle in 1970, "The Soviets thought I was interested in raising potatoes. I was interested in raising Jews." For two years, he met with Soviet Jews to pass along information, prayer books, and pictures of Israel. In 1956, however, he and two other Israeli diplomats were declared persona non grata for their ties to the Soviet Jewish community.

Levanon continued his work from Israel by joining Nativ's Tel Aviv headquarters. He set up a unit called Bar, composed of Israeli diplomats in the delegations to the U.S., UK, and France. Bar was tasked specifically with encouraging the immigration of Soviet Jews to Israel and even received funding from the CIA to aid its cause. After Joseph Stalin's death in 1953, the apparent desire of the Soviet government to improve its image in the West allowed Bar and Nativ to more aggressively press the cause of Soviet Jews.

From 1956 to 1965, Levanon alternated his Bar activities with his administrative duties at Kfar Blum; he served three stints as the economic administrator of the kibbutz. In 1965, Levanon was appointed to serve at the Israeli embassy in Washington, D.C., as a representative of Bar. There, he worked with American Jewish organizations to lobby public officials over the issue of Soviet Jews. He also met with officials at the U.S. State Department and with members of the U.S. Congress to keep them apprised of recent events.

In December 1968, Levanon received an emotional letter written by Moscovite engineering student Yasha Kazakov, originally directed to the Supreme Soviet. In the letter, Kazakov expressed pride in his Judaism and a belief that he had a right to live in the land of the Jewish people. Levanon leaked this letter to The Washington Post, spurring wide coverage in the West. Public pressure mounted on the Soviet government, and eventually they granted Kazakov an exit visa. He immigrated to Israel under the Hebraicized name Yaakov Kedmi, later becoming director of Nativ from 1992 to 1999.

==== Director of Nativ ====
In January 1970, Prime Minister Golda Meir appointed Levanon to serve as the head of Nativ. Levanon's appointment came at a pivotal time in the cause of Soviet Jewry: public campaigns were being organized across the Jewish world in protest of the Soviet government's treatment of several dozen Zionist activists who were accused of planning a hijacking.

Levanon and Nativ responded by organizing the first World Conference of Jewish Communities for Soviet Jewry in Belgium the following year. The conference included 800 people from 38 countries and attracted attention when the Soviet government mounted a public campaign against the participants and host government. Prominent attendees included Menachem Begin, Elie Wiesel, Albert Shanker, and Gershom Scholem. Levanon intentionally downplayed Israel's involvement with the conference so as to leave the impression that other, more powerful countries (particularly the United States) were especially interested in the issue. The conference was marred by the arrival of controversial rabbi Meir Kahane, who the day before had been convicted in New York of disorderly conduct for his actions at a 1969 protest. After he was denied the opportunity to address the delegates, Kahane denounced the conference as undemocratic and timid. His arrest by Belgian police and dramatic press conference upon his return to the U.S. somewhat overshadowed the gathering in Brussels. (Levanon had a tense relationship with "grass roots" activists like Kahane. He once referred to these activists as "active, impatient, and temperamental ... these groups, while at times positive, were sometimes damaging to the cause.")

Further attention to the issue of Soviet Jewry was spurred by the "refuseniks," people denied exit visas from the USSR. The Soviet government in 1972 imposed the "diploma tax," a fee meant to discourage educated Jews and other Soviet citizens from emigrating. Apparently aware that the tax would be controversial, the Soviets intended to keep the law secret. However, word reached Western governments when a Ukrainian Jew forwarded a copy of the decree to Levanon, who then passed it to American and Israeli officials. Levanon allied with Senator Henry "Scoop" Jackson to pass a law denying most-favored nation trade status to countries that restricted the free emigration of its citizens.

According to Levanon, there was an expectation among the political elite that his alignment with Israel's left-wing establishment would cost him his job under right-wing premier Menachem Begin, who was elected in 1977. Begin, however, asked Levanon to stay at his post. Because Nativ's name was never released to the public, nor was any other official name, Soviet Jews had come to know the organization as "Nehemiah's Office."

By the late 1970s, Israeli officials and American grassroots groups were clashing over the direction and purpose of the Soviet Jewry movement. A large number of Soviet emigrants were "dropping out"—abandoning their exit visas intended for Israel and seeking refuge in the United States instead. Levanon and the Israelis were alarmed by this trend and decided that urgent action needed to be taken to reverse it. Levanon, working with the Jewish Agency and philanthropist Max Fisher, tried to have European offices of American Jewish aid groups (particularly the Hebrew Immigrant Aid Society and the American Jewish Joint Distribution Committee) shut down. Fierce opposition among the American Jewish community scuttled the plan, signaling a decline in Nativ's influence in the U.S. According to one scholar, Nativ over time "lost the confidence of activists, both within the USSR and in Western countries." Levanon later reflected, "It was a very bitter and sad period ... I realize that none of us was a hundred percent right; it was a very difficult issue."

== Final years ==
Levanon retired in 1982, returning to Kfar Blum. He wrote two memoirs: Code Name: Nativ, about the history of the organization, and The Road to the Banks of the Jordan, about his migration to Israel. He also traveled to Russia several times after the collapse of the USSR, including a 1995 meeting with the former Soviet president Mikhail Gorbachev. Levanon died in Kfar Blum on September 2, 2003.

== See also ==
- Shaul Avigur
- Soviet Jewry movement
