= David Bartov =

Israeli judge (1924–2018)

- דוד ברטוב
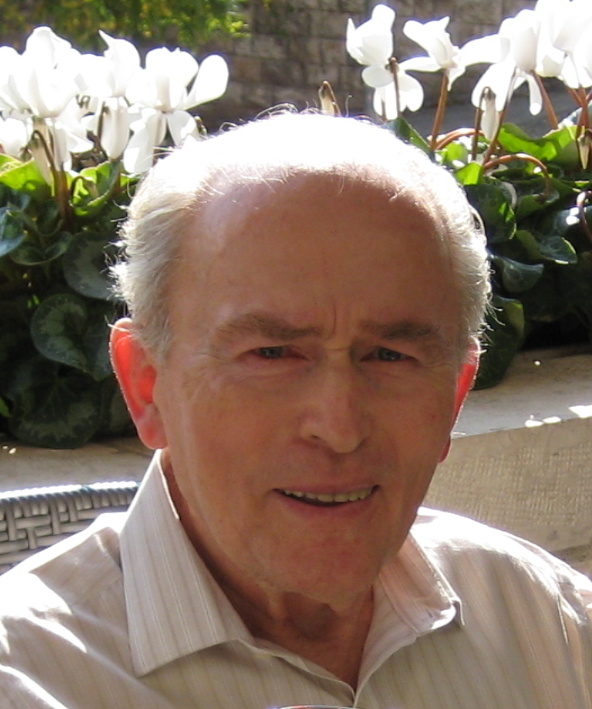
- Born: David Gutensky; 1 February 1924; Motal, Poland (present-day Belarus)
- Died: 29 March 2018 (aged 94)
- Occupation: Judge
- Known for: Head of Nativ (1986–1992)

Head of Nativ
- In office 1986–1992

David Bartov (Hebrew: דוד ברטוב; 1 February 1924 – 29 March 2018) was an Israeli judge and the head of Nativ from 1986 to 1992.

Bartov was born as David Gutensky in the town of Motal, in present-day Belarus. He studied in Tarbut school in Pinsk, graduating in 1939. In 1941, during World War II, he was deported to a labor camp in Siberia. In 1946, he left for Poland and was active in a Zionist youth movement in Poland and Germany.

In 1949 he immigrated to the newly established state of Israel, where he Hebraized his surname to Bartov. He settled in Jerusalem, and was appointed chief secretary in the bureau of Chaim Weizmann, first President of Israel. In 1952, he was appointed head of bureau for the second president, Yitzhak Ben-Zvi. In 1959 he graduated law school at the Hebrew University of Jerusalem, and in 1960 acquired his Master of Laws. After qualifying as lawyer in 1961, he was appointed by President Ben-Zvi as his legal advisor.

In 1964 he was sent to the Soviet Union, serving as First Secretary at the Embassy of Israel in Moscow and de facto acting as a Nativ team member. When the Soviet Union severed its diplomatic relations with Israel in 1967, Bartov returned to Israel. He was appointed judge at the Jerusalem Magistrate Court and served as registrar of the Supreme Court of Israel. In 1979 he was appointed deputy president of the Jerusalem District Court. He served as secretary for the Agranat Commission investigating the failings of Israel Defence Forces in the Yom Kippur War in 1973, and for the Kahan Commission investigating the events that led to the Sabra and Shatila massacre in 1982.

From 1986 to 1992 he was head of Nativ – the Israeli liaison organization for maintaining contact with the Jews living in the Eastern Bloc. From 1992 to 1994 he headed the Nativ mission to the former Soviet Union countries, based in Moscow. After retirement, he continued with voluntary work for the benefit of former Soviet Union jewry, and from 1997 to 2003 was Chairman of the Executive Committee of Yad Ben Zvi research institute.

Bartov's younger brother was Haim Yisraeli, senior advisor to several Israeli Ministers of Defence.
