= Shaike Dan =

Aliyah Bet Activist (1909 - 1994)

- שייקה דן
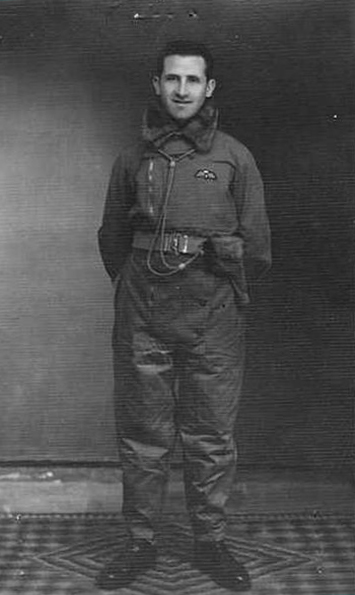
- Shaike Dan in 1944
- Born: Yeshayahu Trachtenberg; 15 November 1909; Lipcani, Bessarabia, Russian Empire (now Moldova)
- Died: 2 March 1994 (aged 84)
- Occupations: Parachutist, founding member of Nativ
- Known for: Rescuing Allied pilots and Jews from Romania during World War II
- Awards: Yigal Alon Award (2017, posthumously)

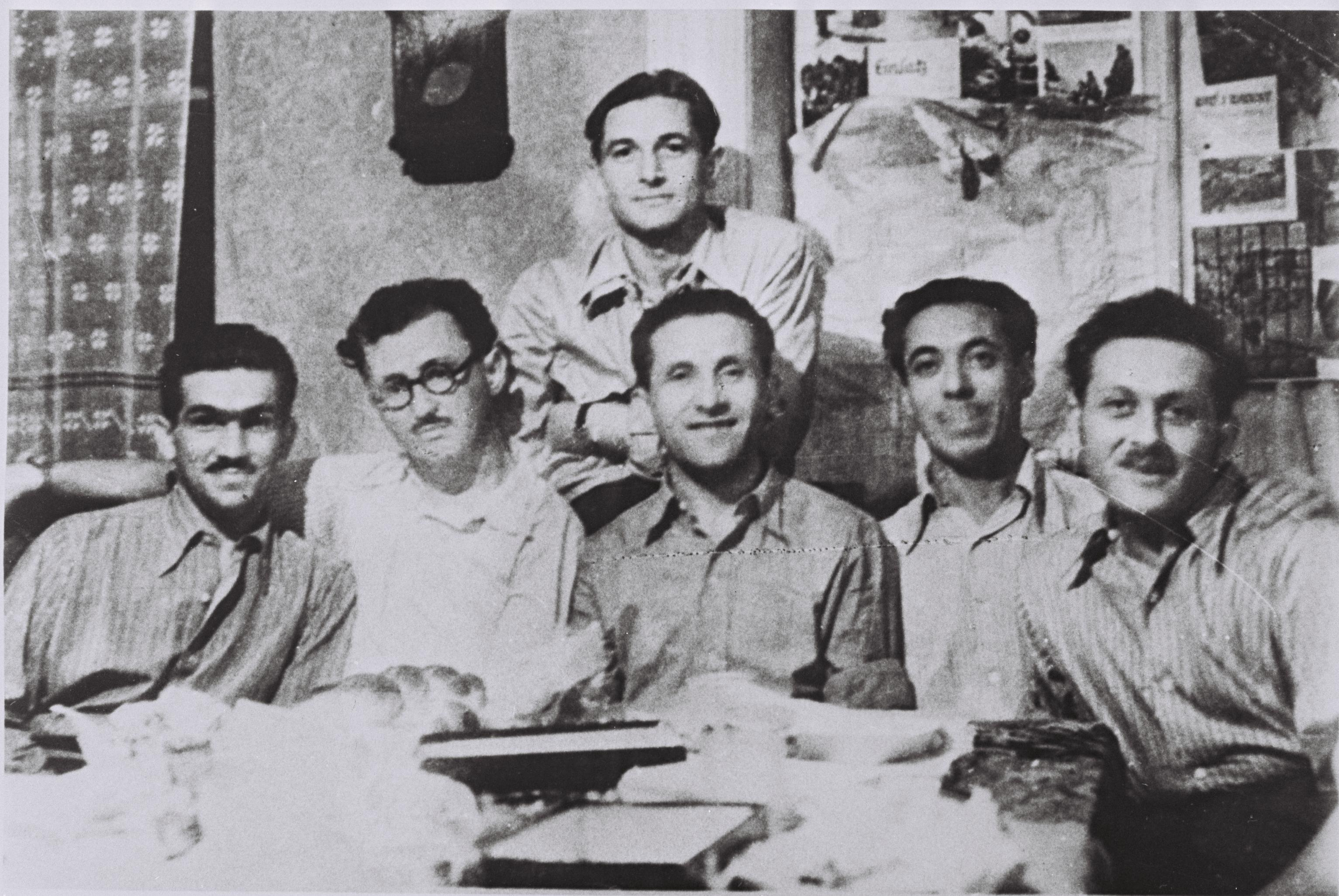
A group of Jewish paratroopers, Shaike Dan is third from the right, sitting, 1944.

Shaike Dan (November 15, 1909 – March 2, 1994) was one of the Jewish Parachutists of Mandate Palestine sent to Eastern European countries occupied by the Nazis. Dan was one of the founders of Nativ.

== Biography ==
Shaike Dan was born as Yeshayahu (Isaiah) Trachtenberg in the town of Lipcani in Bessarabia, Russian Empire (now Moldova), to Jewish parents, Chaim and Rebecca Trachtenberg. He was the third child out of 4 brothers and sisters: Shifra, Nissan, Isaiah, and Dov. He was a soccer fan and played in Lipcani's Jewish soccer team. As a teenager, he got interested in Zionism, and joined the Maccabi movement. Over time he became an activist and organizer in the movement.

In 1935 he immigrated to the Land of Israel. He wanted to start a kibbutz with his friends from Maccabi, but for a time he returned to Romania, and later went to Czechoslovakia, and took part in the Maccabi Youth organization. After a short time, he returned to Israel, and settled in kibbutz Nir Haim.

In 1944, Shaike Dan was parachuted together with Yitzhak Ben-Efraim into enemy territory in Axis member Romania. Their role was to assist in the rescue of several British and American pilots who had to crash in Romania, and to rescue Jews from there and organize their immigration to Israel.

In the 1950s, Dan was one of the founders of the Liaison Office for the Jews of the Soviet Union ("Nativ"), that replaced earlier underground organization Hamossad L'Aliya Bet. From his base in Vienna, he was involved in fleeing Jews from Eastern European countries to Israel. Dan was the representative of the Israeli government in the negotiations with the Romanian authorities regarding the emigration of the Jews from there and he carried shipments of cash with him for that purpose. Dan was involved in the operation until late 1970s; more than 100,000 Jews moved from Romania to Israel through "the channel of Dan and Nativ", out of nearly 300,000 Jews who emigrated from Romania from 1946 to 1989.

In Rishon Lezion and Tel Aviv streets were named after him. He was awarded the Yigal Alon Award in 2017 in recognition of his activities.
