= Rescue Committee of the Jewish Agency =

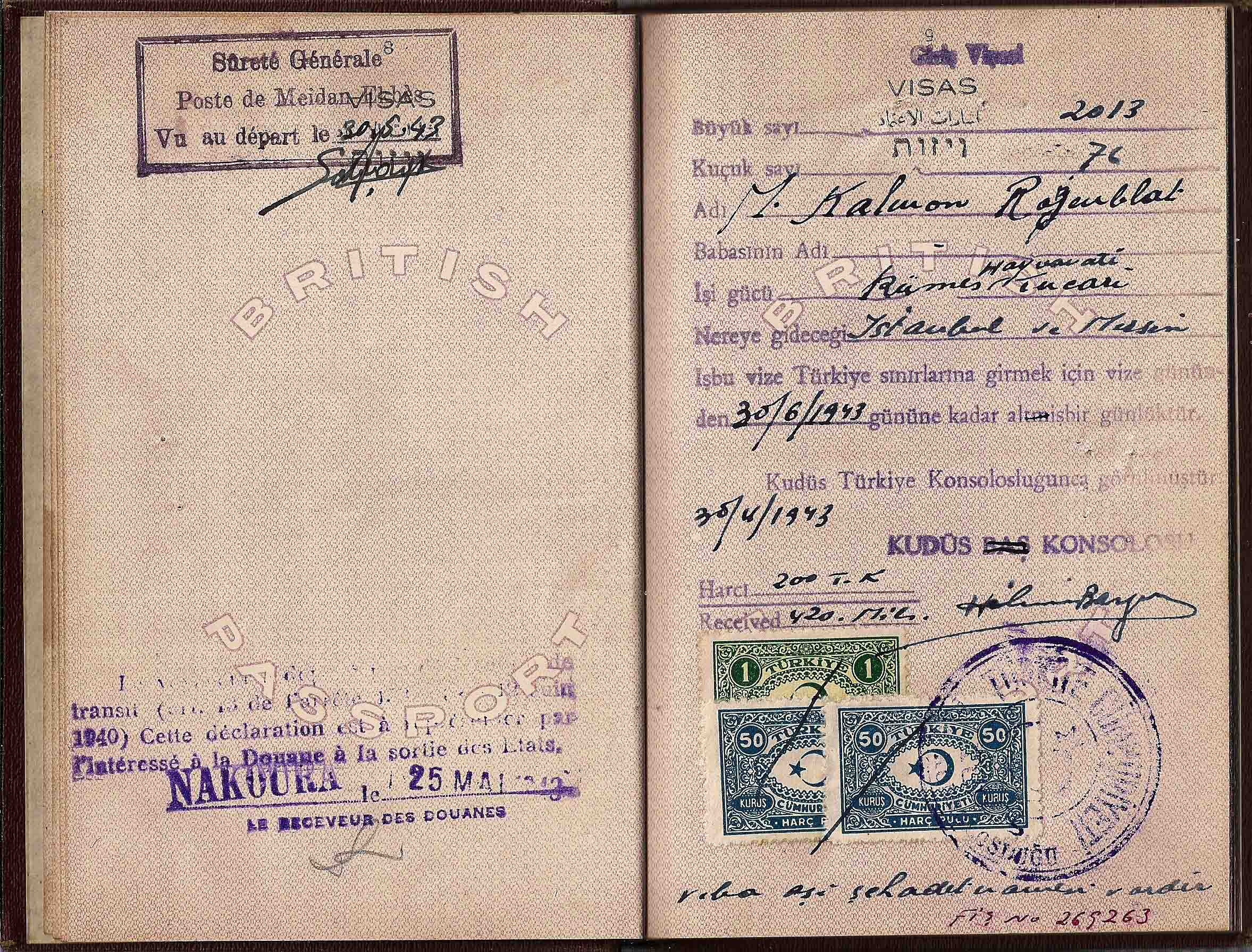
Mandatory passport visa granted in 1943 An Israeli representative was sent to Turkey.

Rescue Committee of the Jewish Agency (or Jewish Agency Rescue Committee or simply: Rescue Committee; Hebrew: ועד ההצלה של הסוכנות היהודית) was an organization founded in the Land of Israel on 22 November 1942 by the Jewish Agency in order to save the Jews of Europe under Nazi occupation during the Holocaust. The Committee was headed by Yitzhak Gruenbaum and among other members were representatives of the Agency, the Jewish National Council, and representatives of the various Zionist parties. The make-up of the committee signaled the unity within the Jewish community in the Land of Israel in their effort to save the Jews of Europe. It officially began operating on 31 January 1943.

== See also ==
- Vaad Hatzalah
- Aid and Rescue Committee
