= Village idiot =

Person locally known for their stupidity

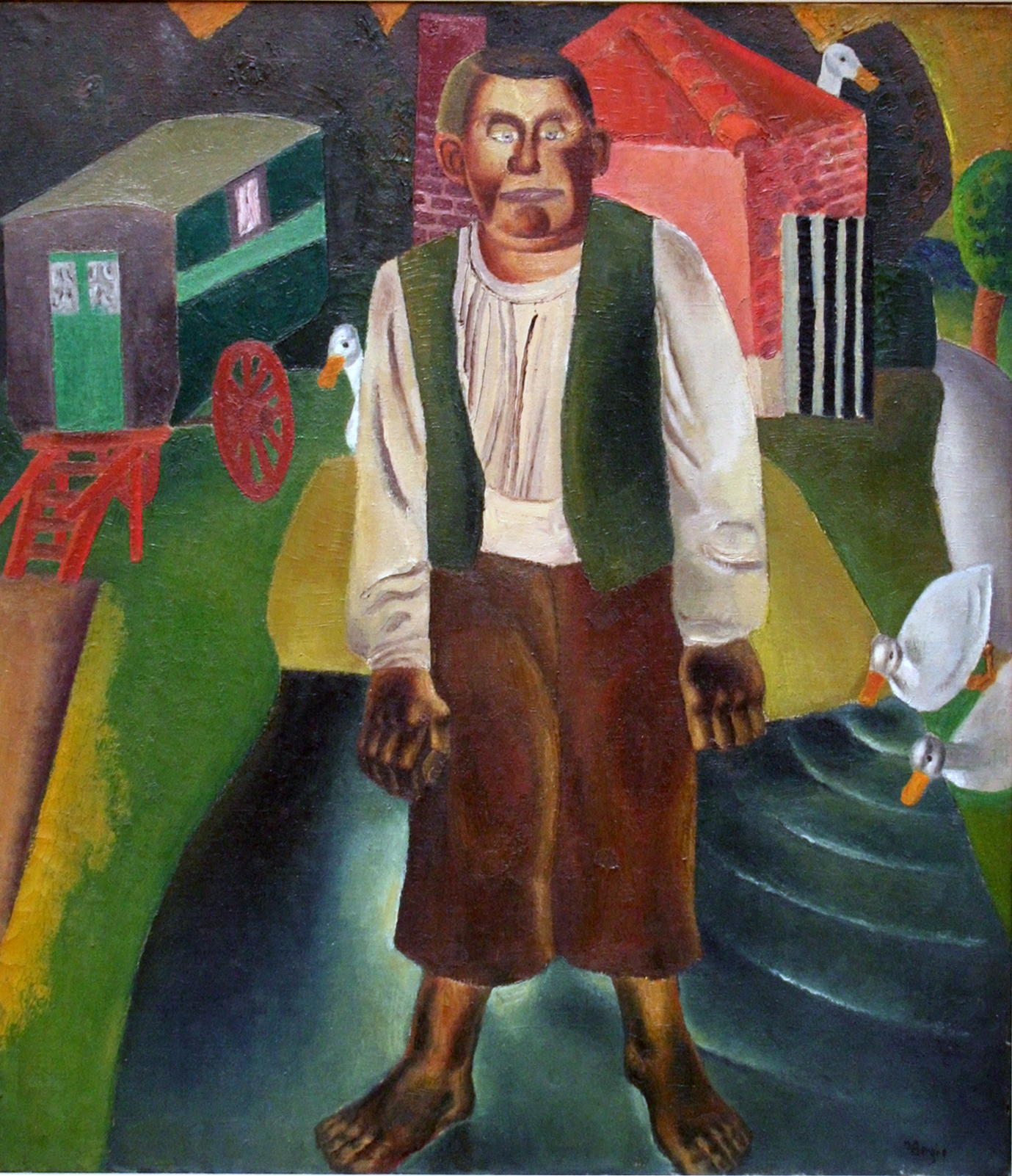
De idioot bij de vijver (The Idiot By the Pond, 1926, Frits Van den Berghe)

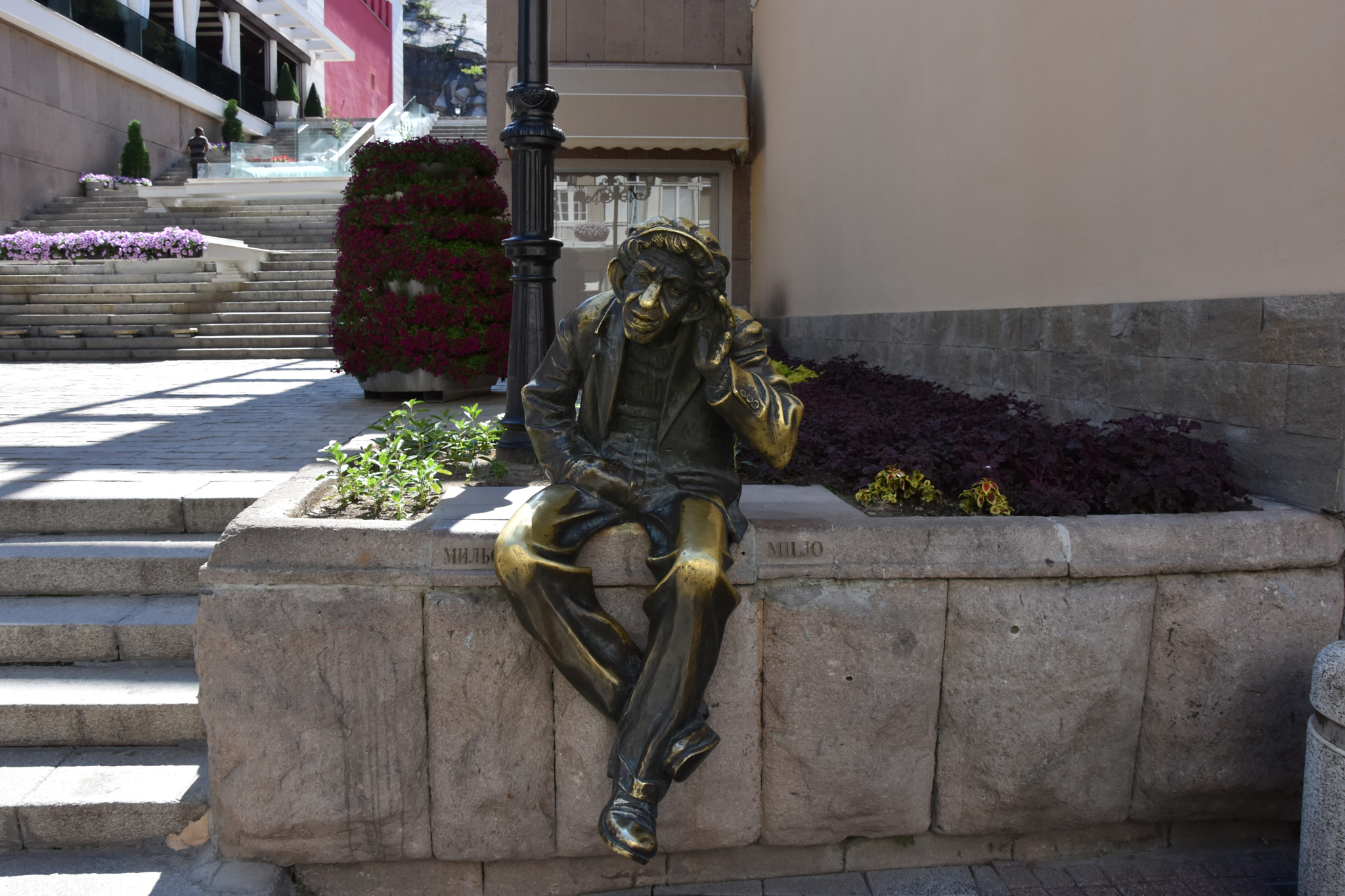
Bronze statue of Milyo, a "village idiot" of Plovdiv

The village idiot is, in strict terms, a person locally known for ignorance or stupidity but is also a common term for a stereotypically silly or nonsensical person or stock character.

== Description ==
The term "village idiot" is also used as a stereotype of the mentally disabled. It has also been applied as an epithet for an unrealistically optimistic or naive individual.

The village idiot was long considered an acceptable social role, a unique individual who was dependent yet contributed to the social fabric of their community. As early as Byzantine times, the "village idiot" was treated as an acceptable form of disabled individual compatible with then-prevailing normative conceptions of social order. The concept of a "village savant" or "village genius" is closely related, often tied to the concept of pre-industrial anti-intellectualism, as both figures are subjects of both pity and derision. The social roles of the two are combined and applied, especially in the sociopolitical context, in the European medieval/Renaissance court jester.

The village idiot has become a character archetype, similar to an oaf or comic relief in narrative structure.
