= Naomi Ben-Ami =

Israeli government official

Naomi Ben-Ami (Hebrew: נעמי בן עמי; born 1960) is an Israeli government official and the head of the liaison bureau Lishkat Hakesher, also known as Nativ. Ben-Ami is the first woman to head the organization.

== Biography ==
Naomi Ben-Ami was born in Chernivtsi, Ukraine, USSR, but because of her parents' work, she lived mostly in Kazakhstan. In September 1973 she and her family immigrated to Israel, just weeks before the outbreak of the Yom Kippur War. After spending time at an ulpan in Dimona, her parents took jobs as physicians in Jerusalem. Ben-Ami attended high school at Gymnasia Rehavia.

After graduating she entered the Israel Defense Forces, where she served in the Central Command as a secretary. Ben-Ami then studied international relations and Russian studies at Hebrew University of Jerusalem.

She has worked at the Israeli Foreign Ministry since 1983, including a posting at Israel's Moscow embassy as a political advisor. From 2003 to 2006 she was the Israeli ambassador to Ukraine.

Ben-Ami is a married mother of two.

== See also ==
- Israel–Ukraine relations
