= Dalia Ofer =

Israeli historian

Dalia Ofer (Hebrew: דליה עופר; born 8 January 1939, Jerusalem) is a retired Professor of Holocaust and East European Studies at the Institute of Contemporary Jewry, The Hebrew University of Jerusalem.

== Early life and education ==
Ofer graduated from the Hebrew University High School in 1956, completed her IDF service in the Nahal and went to Kibbutz Ein Gev. Ofer received her B.A. in history from the Hebrew University in 1962 and, a year later, received a teaching certificate. From 1964 until 1982 she taught at the Hebrew University High School. In 1973 she completed her M.A. in history summa cum laude, with a thesis titled “The Rescue and Aid Operation of the Yishuv Delegation in Istanbul, 1943–1944.” In 1981 Ofer received her Ph.D. from the Hebrew University for her dissertation titled “Illegal Immigration to Palestine 1939–1941.”

== History prizes ==
In 1992, Derekh ba-yam, her first book, appeared in Hebrew and won that year's Yad Ben-Zvi Award. The English translation, Escaping the Holocaust: Illegal Immigration to the Land of Israel, 1939–1944, won the Jewish Book Award in the same year.

== Bibliography ==
- Escaping the Holocaust, Illegal Immigration to the Land of Israel 1939–1944 (Oxford: Oxford University Press, 1990)
- The Dead-End Journey: The Tragic Story of the Kladovo-Sabac Group (Maryland: University Press of America, 1996)
- Women in the Holocaust (New Haven: Yale University Press, 1998)
- The Holocaust: The Particular and the Universal. Edited with Samuel Almog, David Bankeir, Daniel Blatman (Jerusalem: 2001)
- The Holocaust: History and Memory, edited with Samuel Almog, David Bankeir, Daniel Blatman (Indiana: Indiana University Press, 2001)
