= Nativ (Liaison Bureau) =

Israeli governmental liaison organization

- נתיב
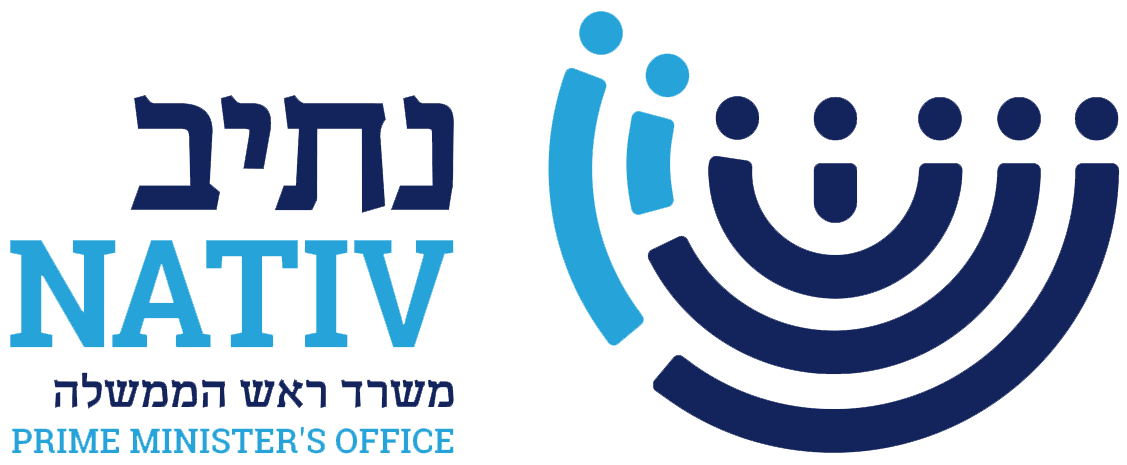
- Nativ logo used since 2018

Agency overview
- Formed: June 1951
- Jurisdiction: Government of Israel
- Headquarters: Jerusalem
- Agency executive: Naomi Ben-Ami, Chairman
- Parent agency: Prime Minister's Office
- Website: www.nativ.gov.il

Nativ (Hebrew: נתיב – path), formerly Lishkat Hakesher or The Liaison Bureau - "Nativ", is an Israeli governmental liaison organization that maintained contact with Jews living in the Eastern Bloc during the Cold War and encouraged aliyah, immigration to Israel.

== History ==
Founded as part of the Prime Minister's office by Prime Minister Moshe Sharett in 1952–1953, Nativ was designed to function covertly, making contacts, fostering Jewish education, and aiding immigration to Israel. Nativ was not the first organization to do this; Mossad Le'aliyah Bet, part of the Haganah, had brought Jews to Israel in defiance of the British Mandate, but this ended with the creation of Israel. Nativ was to continue that mission, except now in defiance of the Soviet Union. Although it operated in a clandestine manner, the official policy was never to break Soviet laws. This did not stop the KGB from suspecting that it was spying. In fact, as recently as 1998 Nativ was accused of conducting espionage operations. A former Israeli ambassador to Moscow claims that the KGB conducted exhaustive surveillance measures on all their operations, but never directly interfered.

Nativ began its foreign operations out of Israeli embassies, yet this ended after the Six-Day War, when Russia and fellow Soviet countries severed diplomatic ties with Israel. This led Nativ to focus more of its efforts on Western countries, where it lobbied governments to promote greater emigration freedom in the USSR with the phrase "Let My People Go". While its Soviet operations were stymied, the Refusenik movement began, bringing greater international attention to the Soviet emigration issue. Nativ assisted the movement by materially supporting the refuseniks and fostering refusenik organizations.

Logo previously used by Nativ

In the mid 1970s international pressure forced the Soviet Union to allow greater emigration, and the number of Soviet Jews leaving for Israel increased dramatically. The dissolution of the Soviet Union ended the need to conduct operations clandestinely, and today Lishkat Hakesher openly runs Jewish clubs and education services in Russia. It is also tasked with issuing visas and processing immigrants coming to Israel under the Law of Return. However, it has recently faced budget and personnel cuts, immigrant backlogs, and pressure to close from groups including the Mossad and Shin Bet. As of November 2006, Nativ had 60 employees and a budget of approximately 11.6 million USD.

When Kadima formed a coalition government with Yisrael Beiteinu, Nativ was moved from the Prime Minister's Office to the Ministry of Strategic Affairs. In February 2007, Avigdor Liberman, the Minister of Strategic Affairs and a Russian emigre, proposed that Lishkat Hakesher move into new operations among Russian Jews who emigrated to the United States, Canada, and Germany. Under Liberman's leadership, Nativ's Operation Germany attempted to convince ethnic Jewish immigrants from the former Soviet Union to emigrate from Germany to Israel. However, with his resignation in January 2008, plans of placing two Nativ employees in Germany are not likely to be carried out.

== Organization ==
=== Head ===
As of 2005, the only requirements to lead Lishkat Hakesher were the ability to speak Russian and experience in managing bureaucracies. Headquartered in Tel Aviv, the director reports directly to the prime minister. All Nativ representatives in foreign countries report to the director, and are not responsible to the local diplomats. Representatives are supposed to inform the local ambassador of their activities, though failure to do this has caused tension in the past.

The prime minister has the power to directly appoint a new head, although in the last succession Prime Minister Ariel Sharon created a special committee, chaired by Secretary Yisrael Maimon, to recommend a replacement. The committee continued searching for a candidate under newly elected Prime Minister Ehud Olmert, finally selecting Naomi Ben-Ami, the Israeli ambassador to Ukraine.

=== List of leaders ===
- Shaul Avigur, 1953–1970
- Nehemiah Levanon, 1970–1980
- Yehuda Lapidot, 1980–1986
- David Bar-Tov, 1986–1992
- Yaakov Kedmi, 1992–1999
- Zvi Magen, 1999–2006
- Naomi Ben-Ami, 2006–2015
- Alex Kushnir, 2016–2017
- Neta Briskin-Peleg, 2017–present

=== Branches ===
- Information
- Activity
- Content
