= Shaul Avigur =

Israeli Intelligence Community founder

- שאול אביגור
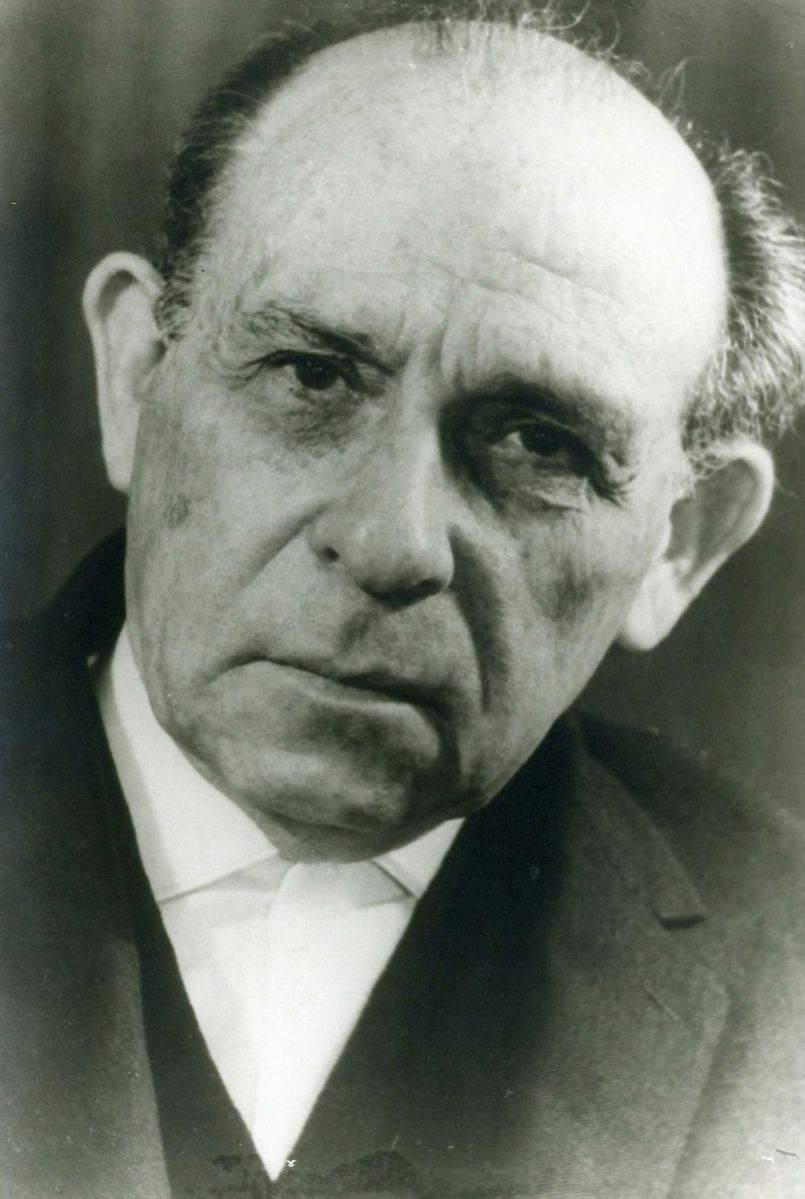
- Born: Saul Meyeroff; 11 September 1899; Dvinsk, Russian Empire
- Died: 29 August 1978 (aged 78)
- Occupation: Intelligence officer
- Known for: Founding member of the Israeli Intelligence Community
- Awards: Israel Prize

Head of Nativ
- In office 1953–1970

Shaul Avigur (Hebrew: שאול אביגור; 11 September 1899 – 29 August 1978) was a founder of the Israeli Intelligence Community.

== Biography ==
Avigur was born in Dvinsk under the name Saul Meyeroff (later Meirov; Hebrew: מאירוב), but when his son Gur Meyeroff was killed in the 1948 Arab–Israeli War, he changed it to Avigur, meaning "Father of Gur". Along with Reuven Shiloah, Avigur was instrumental in forming SHAI, the intelligence wing of the Haganah, in 1934. Since 1939 he was involved in the Mossad Le'aliyah Bet operations to smuggle Jews into the British Mandate of Palestine and was named its commander. During the 1948 Arab–Israeli War, he acted as David Ben-Gurion's deputy defense minister. In 1953 he was appointed the founding head of the "Liaison Bureau" (Lishkat Hakesher), also known as "Nativ", an Israeli organization that maintained contact with Jews in the Soviet Union during the Cold War. He headed the organization until 1970. Avigur was the brother-in-law of former Prime Minister Moshe Sharett.

== Awards ==
In 1973, Avigur was awarded the Israel Prize, for his special contribution to society and the State.

== See also ==
- List of Israel Prize recipients
- Nehemiah Levanon (1915–2003), Nativ operative in the USSR
