= Elam Rotem =

Israeli composer and musician

- עילם רותם
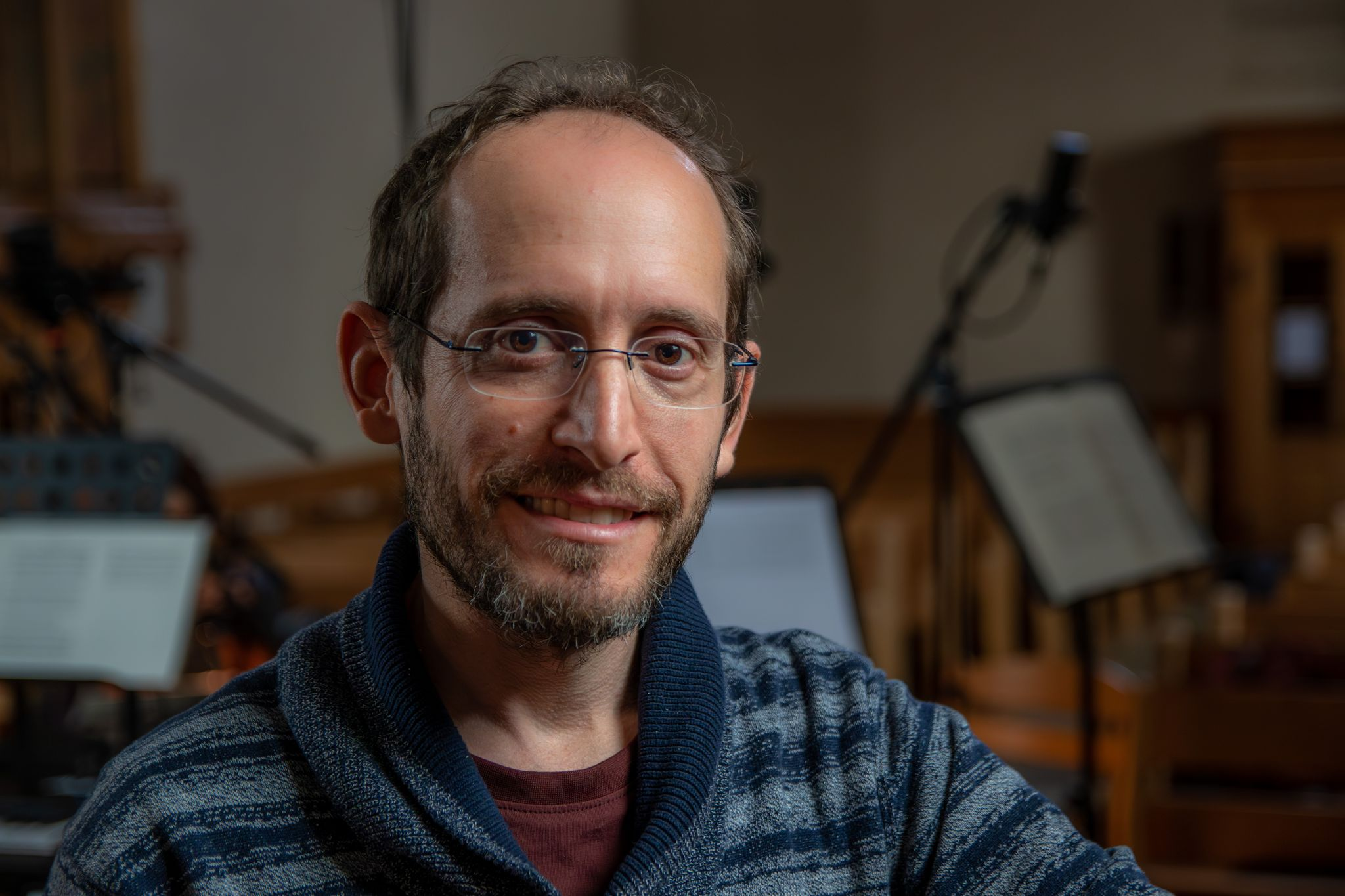
- Born: 29 November 1984 (age 41); Sdot Yam, Israel
- Occupations: Composer, singer, harpsichordist and scholar of early music
- Years active: 2008–present

Academic background
- Education: University of Würzburg
- Thesis: Early Basso Continuo Practice: Implicit Evidence in the Music of Emilio de' Cavalieri (Frühe Basso Continuo-Praxis: Implizite Evidenz in der Musik Emilio de' Cavalieris) (2016)
- Doctoral advisor: Andreas Haug, Ulrich Konrad

Elam Rotem (Hebrew: עילם רותם; born 29 November 1984) is a composer, singer, and harpsichordist based in Basel, Switzerland. He is a leading expert in early music, specifically the music of the turn of the 17th century. He is the founder and director of the group Profeti della Quinta and maintains Early Music Sources, a website collating writings and information on the subject of early music.

== Life and career ==
Rotem was born in 1984 in Sdot Yam, Israel. During his studies at Kibbutz Kabri High School, he set up a vocal quintet with fellow students. This ensemble went on to become the international ensemble known as "Profeti della Quinta" which now performs regularly throughout Europe, North America, Israel and further abroad. Rotem studied for a bachelor's degree in harpsichord at the Jerusalem Academy of Music and Dance and studied for advanced degrees in basso continuo, improvisation and composition at the Schola Cantorum Basiliensis. He went on to complete his PhD in 2016 through Schola Cantorum Basiliensis in a joint programme with the University of Würzburg, Germany.

Rotem specializes in the musical style of the 16th and 17th centuries in Italy, and his ensemble, Profeti Della Quinta, is known worldwide for their performances of the music of Italian Jewish composer Salomone Rossi, who was the first composer to use the Western-Christian musical language to compose Hebrew prayers and psalms ("The Songs of Solomon", 1623).

In 2017 Rotem recorded the recently discovered "Carlo G" manuscript with Profeti Della Quinta. This was the first recording of this early 17th-century score which had been discovered in a flea market after being lost for centuries. Rotem also published an edition of this unique score, which features a fully realised keyboard accompaniment.

Rotem has also published a number of editions of 17-century music, many of which are freely available on The Choral Public Domain Library and The International Music Score Library Project

In addition, Rotem operates a YouTube channel named "Putzimputzim" where he uploads comedic songs that he wrote and performed, some to ancient compositions and some original songs.

== Compositions ==
Rotem has composed major works in the Italian style of the turn of the 17th century, based on biblical texts in the original Hebrew. Hebrew works were composed at that time by the Mantuan composer, Salomone Rossi.

Whilst countless compositions have been written based on biblical texts, Rotem's works are unique, both in his use of the late Renaissance style in the 21st century and in his adherence to the original Hebrew texts.

- Rappresentatione di Giuseppe e i suoi Fratelli (Joseph and his Brethren)

Musical drama in three acts, composed in the spirit of the early operas. 2014.

- Quia Amore Langueo

Song of Songs and Dark Biblical Love Tales. 2015.

- The Lamentation of David

A setting of 2 Samuel 1:17-27. 2020.

== Recordings ==
- Cipriano de Rore, Madrigals for four voices
- Philippe Verdelot, Madrigals for four voices
- Amor, Fortuna e Morte, Madrigals by de Rore, Luzzaschi, Gesualdo and Monteverdi
- The Carlo G Manuscript, virtuoso liturgical music from the early 17th century
- Luzzasco Luzzaschi (c. 1545–1607): madrigals, motets, and instrumental music
- Elam Rotem / Quia Amore Langueo, Song of Songs and Dark Biblical Love Tales, motets and dramatic scenes composed in the spirit of early 17th-century Italian music
- Orlando di Lasso / Musica Reservata, Secret music for Albrecht V / The penitential psalms by Orlando di Lassus performed in a historical setting
- Elam Rotem / Rappresentatione di Giuseppe e i suoi Fratelli, Joseph and his Brethren, Biblical musical drama in three acts composed by Elam Rotem in the spirit of the early operas
- Il Mantovano Hebreo, Italian madrigals, Hebrew prayers and instrumental music by Salomone Rossi
- Rore, Monteverdi, and Gesualdo, Part of the 2013 Festival CD "Wege zum Barock"
- Hebreo: The Search for Salomone Rossi, a film by Joseph Rochlitz with Profeti Della Quinta (official website)
- Salomone Rossi: 'The Song of Solomon' and instrumental music, Profeti Della Quinta and Ensemble Muscadin
