= Don Harrán =

Don Harran (also spelled Harrán, Hebrew: דון חרן; 22 April 1936 – 15 June 2016) was professor of musicology at the Hebrew University of Jerusalem. (Note: Faculty of Humanities, Department of Musicology)

== Biography ==
Born Donald Lee Hersh in Cambridge, Massachusetts, Don Harrán did his undergraduate work at Yale University, majoring in French literature (B.A. magna cum laude, 1957), and pursued graduate studies in musicology, mainly under Edward Lowinsky and, as dissertation advisor, Joseph Kerman, at the University of California at Berkeley (M.A., 1959; Ph.D., 1963). (Note: For title of dissertation, see section "Books".) He settled in Israel with his Israeli wife, who also studied at UC Berkeley, in 1963. During the years 1963–66 he taught music history at the Rubin Academy of Music in Jerusalem and, from 1966, was a member of the Department of Musicology at The Hebrew University of Jerusalem, becoming Emmanuel Alexandre Associate Professor of Musicology in 1976, Artur Rubinstein Full Professor of Musicology in 1980, and since his retirement in 2004 Artur Rubinstein Professor Emeritus of Musicology. He chaired the Department of Musicology during the years 1977–1980, 1991–1992, and 1994–1997. In 1993 he was visiting professor at the Center for Medieval and Renaissance Studies at the University of California, Los Angeles, and in 2004 Visiting Professor at Villa I Tatti (Harvard University Center for Research in the Italian Renaissance), Florence. He received various fellowships and grants, among them the American Council of Learned Societies (1974–75), the Memorial Foundation of Jewish Culture (1980–81, 1992–93, 2001–02), Newberry Library (Chicago; 1993), Folger Shakespeare Library (Washington D.C.; 1998), the American Philosophical Society (1975), the Gladys Krieble Delmas Foundation (1978), the Israel National Academy of Sciences (1976–1977, 1982–1984, 1985–1987, 1988–1989), and the Institute for Advanced Study (Princeton, New Jersey; 2001–2002, 2004).

Harrán served as musical advisor for the Cultural Center of the American Embassy in Israel, organizing concerts of American music and lecturing thereon during the years 1967–70; as corresponding editor on musicology in Israel for the journal Current Musicology from 1968 to 1990; and, since 1908, he was Associate Editor (for music history) for the Journal of Interdisciplinary Studies. He was a member of Phi Beta Kappa, the Israel Musicological Society (chair, 1978–80), the American Musicological Society, the International Musicological Society (board of directors, 1987–92; vice-president, 1992–97), the Renaissance Society of America, the World Union of Jewish Studies, and the European Association of Jewish Studies. During the years 1996–2000 he was named Acting Director of the Jewish Music Research Centre (Hebrew University, Jerusalem).

Don Harrán was married to Aya, granddaughter of the biblical commentator Samuel Leib Gordon, and a music therapist; they had two children.

== Prizes and honors ==
- Medal from the city of Tours in conjunction with the Université François Rabelais, Tours (1997)
- Donald Tovey Memorial Prize, Oxford University (1977)
- Michael Landau Prize for Scholarly Achievement in the Arts (1999)
- Honorary Foreign Member of the American Academy of Arts and Sciences (2005)
- Knight (Cavaliere) of the Order of the Star of Italian Solidarity (2006)
- Corresponding (Honorary Foreign) Member, American Musicological Society (2006)

== Writings ==
Principal areas of research: word-tone relations in the Renaissance as determined by historical, theoretical, and practical/performing considerations; humanism and music; music as rhetoric; instrumental music in the early Baroque; Jewish musicians (composers, singers, instrumentalists, theorists), both male and female, in 16th- and 17th-century Italy; early Jewish female poets, among them Sara Copia Sullam; and the beginnings of Hebrew music historiography in the 18th century. He was an expert of Jewish western art music.

== Books ==
- In Defense of Music: The Case for Music as Argued by a Singer and Scholar of the Late Fifteenth Century. Lincoln: University of Nebraska Press, 1989. xiii + 175 pp.
- In Search of Harmony: Hebrew and Humanist Elements in Sixteenth-Century Musical Thought. Musicological Studies & Documents 42. Neuhausen-Stuttgart: Hänssler-Verlag for the American Institute of Musicology, 1988. xx + 301 pp.
- "Maniera" e il madrigale: una raccolta di poesie musicali del Cinquecento. Biblioteca dell'Archivum romanicum, series 1, vol. 158. Florence: Leo S. Olschki, 1980. 123 pp.
- Musikologyah: techumim u-megamot [Musicology: Areas and Aims]. Jerusalem: Bialik Institute, 1975. 240 pp.
- Salamone Rossi, Jewish Musician in Late Renaissance Mantua. Oxford: Oxford University Press, 1999, soft cover edition, 2003. x + 310 pp.
- Sarra Copia Sulam, Jewish Poet and Intellectual in Seventeenth-Century Venice: The Works of Sarra Copia Sulam in Verse and Prose, along with Writings of Her Contemporaries in Her Praise, Condemnation, or Defense. Introduced, edited, and translated by Harrán. Chicago: The University of Chicago Press, 2009. xxxiii + 598 pp.
- Verdelot and the Early Madrigal. Ph.D. dissertation. 2 vols. University of California, Berkeley, 1963. iv + 307 pp.; 170 pp.
- Word-Tone Relations in Musical Thought: From Antiquity to the Seventeenth Century. Musicological Studies & Documents 40. Neuhausen-Stuttgart: Hänssler-Verlag for the American Institute of Musicology, 1986. xviii + 517 pp.

== Critical editions ==
- The Anthologies of Black-Note Madrigals. Corpus Mensurabilis Musicae 73. 5 vols. in 6. Neuhausen-Stuttgart: Hänssler-Verlag for the American Institute of Musicology, 1978–81.
  - Vol. 1, pt. 1 (1978): "Il primo libro d'i madrigali ... a misura di breve ... quatuor vocum (1542)". lvii + 79 pp.
  - Vol. 1, pt. 2 (1978): "Il primo libro d'i madrigali ... a misura di breve ... quatuor vocum (1542)". lviii–lxxxii + 153 pp.
  - Vol. 2 (1978): "Il secondo libro de li madrigali ... a misura di breve ... a quatro voci (1543)". xliii + 148 pp.
  - Vol. 3 (1980): "Libro terzo ... li madrigali a quatro voce a notte negre (1549)". xxxv + 117 pp.
  - Vol. 4 (1980): 2Il vero terzo libro di madrigali ... a note negre (1549)". xliii + 131 pp.
  - Vol. 5 (1981): "Black-Note Madrigals (3–4 v.) from the Earliest Printed Collections (1540, 1541, 1542)". xxiv + 49 pp.
- Hubert Naich, Opera Omnia. Corpus Mensurabilis Musicae 94. Neuhausen-Stuttgart: Hänssler-Verlag for the American Institute of Musicology, 1983. lvii + 197 pp.
- Salamone Rossi: Complete Works. Corpus Mensurabilis Musicae 100. Vols. 1–12, Neuhausen-Stuttgart: Hänssler-Verlag for the American Institute of Musicology, 1995; vols. 13a and 13b, Middleton, Wis.: American Institute of Musicology, 2003.
  - Vol. 1: "Madrigals for 5 voices, Book 1 (1600)". lxxxvi + 94 pp.
  - Vol. 2: "Madrigals for 5 voices, Book 2 (1602)". xxxii + 68 pp.
  - Vol. 3: "Madrigals for 5 voices, Book 3 (1603)". xxxv + 67 pp.
  - Vol. 4: "Madrigals for 5 voices, Book 4 (1610)". xxxvi + 67 pp.
  - Vol. 5: "Madrigals for 5 voices, Book 5 (1622)". xxxiv + 23 pp.
  - Vol. 6: "Canzonette for 3 voices (1589)". xxxvi + 32 pp.
  - Vol. 7: "Madrigals for 4 voices (1614)". xxxiii + 59 pp.
  - Vol. 8: "Madrigaletti for 2–3 voices (1628)", plus three appendices. lix + 67 pp.
  - Vol. 9: "Sinfonie, Gagliarde, etc., for 3–5 voices, Book 1 (1607)". xxviii + 37 pp.
  - Vol. 10: "Sinfonie, Gagliarde, etc., for 3–5 voices, Book 2 (1608)". xx + 55 pp.
  - Vol. 11: "Sonatas, Sinfonie, Gagliarde, etc., for 3 voices, Book 3 (1623)". xxiii + 83 pp.
  - Vol. 12: "Sonatas, Sinfonie, Gagliarde, etc., for 3 voices, Book 4 (1622)". xxiv + 91 pp.
  - Vol. 13a: "Ha-shirim asher li-shelomo [The Songs of Solomon], for 3–8 voices (1623)": General Introduction. xxx + 222 pp.; 24 illustrations.
  - Vol. 13b: "Ha-shirim asher li-shelomo [The Songs of Solomon], for 3–8 voices (1623)": Music (33 Hebrew works). x + 238 pp. See also six pitch corrections at Volume Update (August 2008).

== Articles ==
Harrán had numerous articles published in musicological and interdisciplinary journals as well as in dedicatory volumes and anthologies; see § External links).

- Harrán, Don (2001). "Moscato, Judah". Grove Music Online. Oxford: Oxford University Press. doi:10.1093/gmo/9781561592630.article.42431. ISBN 978-1-56159-263-0. (subscription, Wikilibrary access, or UK public library membership required)

== Translations ==
- Hamel, Fred. Das Atlantisbuch der Musik (9th ed., Zurich: Atlantis Verlag, 1959), revised and translated into Hebrew as Toledot ha-musikah ha-eropit [The History of European Music]. Ramat Gat: Masada, 1969. 318 pp.
- Krenek, Ernst. "Amerikas Einfluß auf eingewanderte Komponisten" (Musica 13 [1959]: 757–761): "America's Influence on its Émigré Composers", Perspectives of New Music 8 (1970): 112–117.
