= Jewish ghettos in Europe =

In the early modern era, many European Jews were confined to ghettos and placed under strict regulations as well as restrictions in many European cities. The character of ghettos fluctuated over the centuries. In some cases, they comprised a Jewish quarter, the area of a city traditionally inhabited by Jews. In many instances, ghettos were places of terrible poverty and—especially during periods of rapid population growth—ghettos had small, crowded houses cramped along narrow streets. Residents had their own justice system.

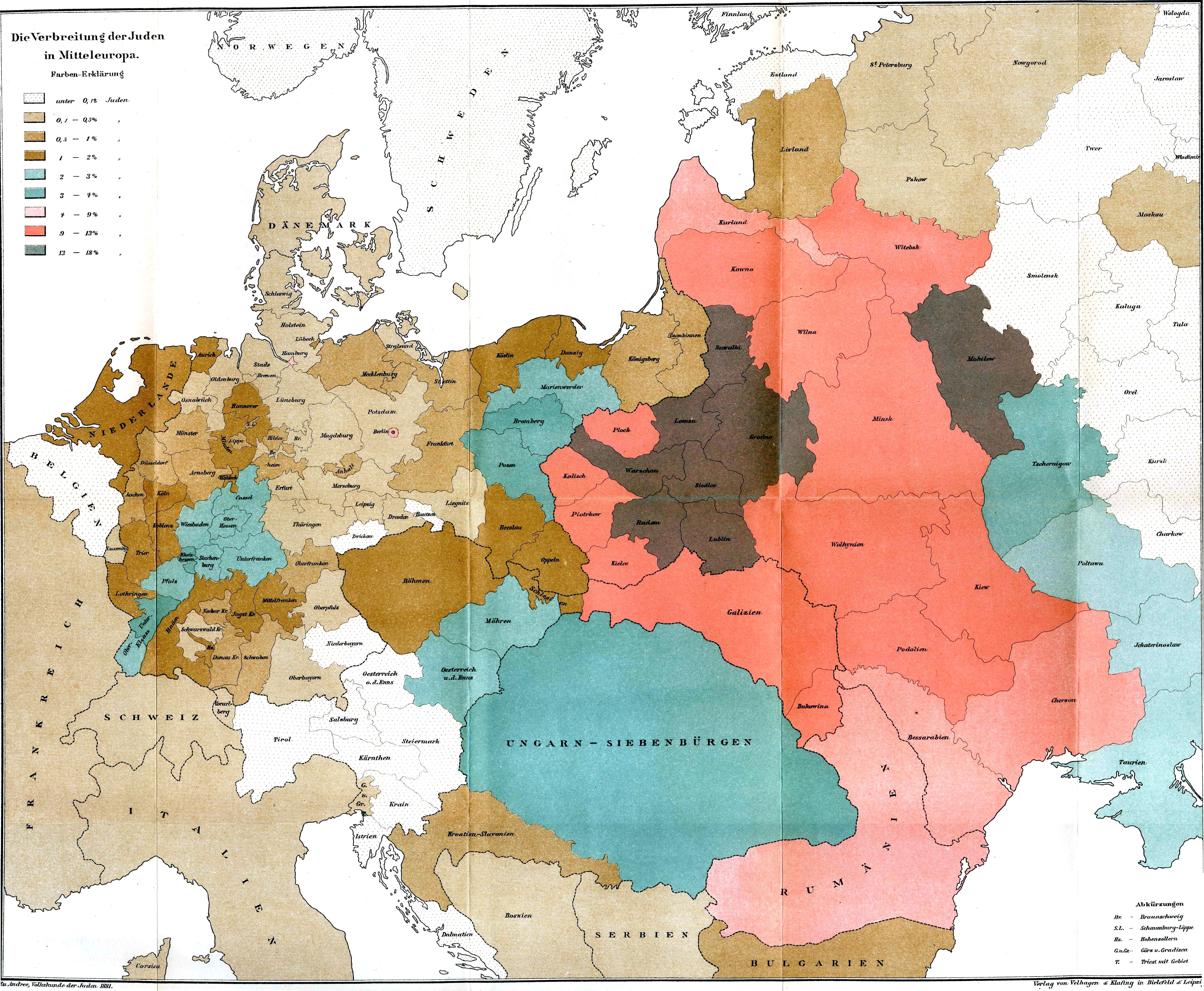
The distribution of the Jews in Central Europe (1881, German). Percentage of local population: 13–18% 9–13% 4–9% 3–4% 2–3% 1–2% 0.3–1% 0.1–0.3% < 0.1%

In the 19th century, with the coming of Jewish emancipation, Jewish ghettos were progressively abolished, and their walls taken down. However, in the course of World War II, Nazi Germany created a totally new Jewish ghetto system for the purpose of identification, exploitation, persecution, deportation (often to concentration camps) and terrorization of Jews, mostly in Eastern Europe. According to the United States Holocaust Memorial Museum archives, the Nazis "established at least 1,000 ghettos in German-occupied and annexed Poland and the Soviet Union alone."

== Origin ==
The ghetto system began in Renaissance Italy in July 1555 with Pope Paul IV's issuing of the bull Cum nimis absurdum. This change in papal policy implemented a series of restrictions on Jewish life that dramatically reshaped their place in society. Among these restrictions were the requirement that Jews identify themselves by wearing a yellow badge, limitations on the ownership of property, restrictions in commerce, and tighter regulation of banking. However, the most visible of these restrictions was the requirement that Jews reside in sectioned off, sanctioned neighborhoods known as ghettos. The formation of the ghetto system also brought about changes to Jewish economic activity.

As a result of the Cum nimis absurdum regulations and the increasing complexity of the early modern economy, the role of Jews as money lenders became more difficult and less profitable. This, as well as the fact that ghettos were often located near town commercial centers, drove Jews away from money lending and towards the role of second-hand merchants. In this role, Jews were forbidden from selling anything considered vital to life such as food or other high value commodities, so they gravitated toward predatory practices, such as reselling secondhand goods through pawn shops.

Some scholars, however, have argued that this shift in papal policy inadvertently ended up improving some aspects of the Jewish experience relative to the prior medieval period. Jewish historian Robert Bonfil has argued that the formation of ghettos acted as a sort of middle ground between acceptance and expulsion by the Christian authorities. Following the formation of the ghetto system, there was a sharp decline in anti-Semitic incidents (such as pogroms, forced expulsions, and accusations of ritual murder); these had been more common during the medieval period.

== World War II and the Holocaust ==
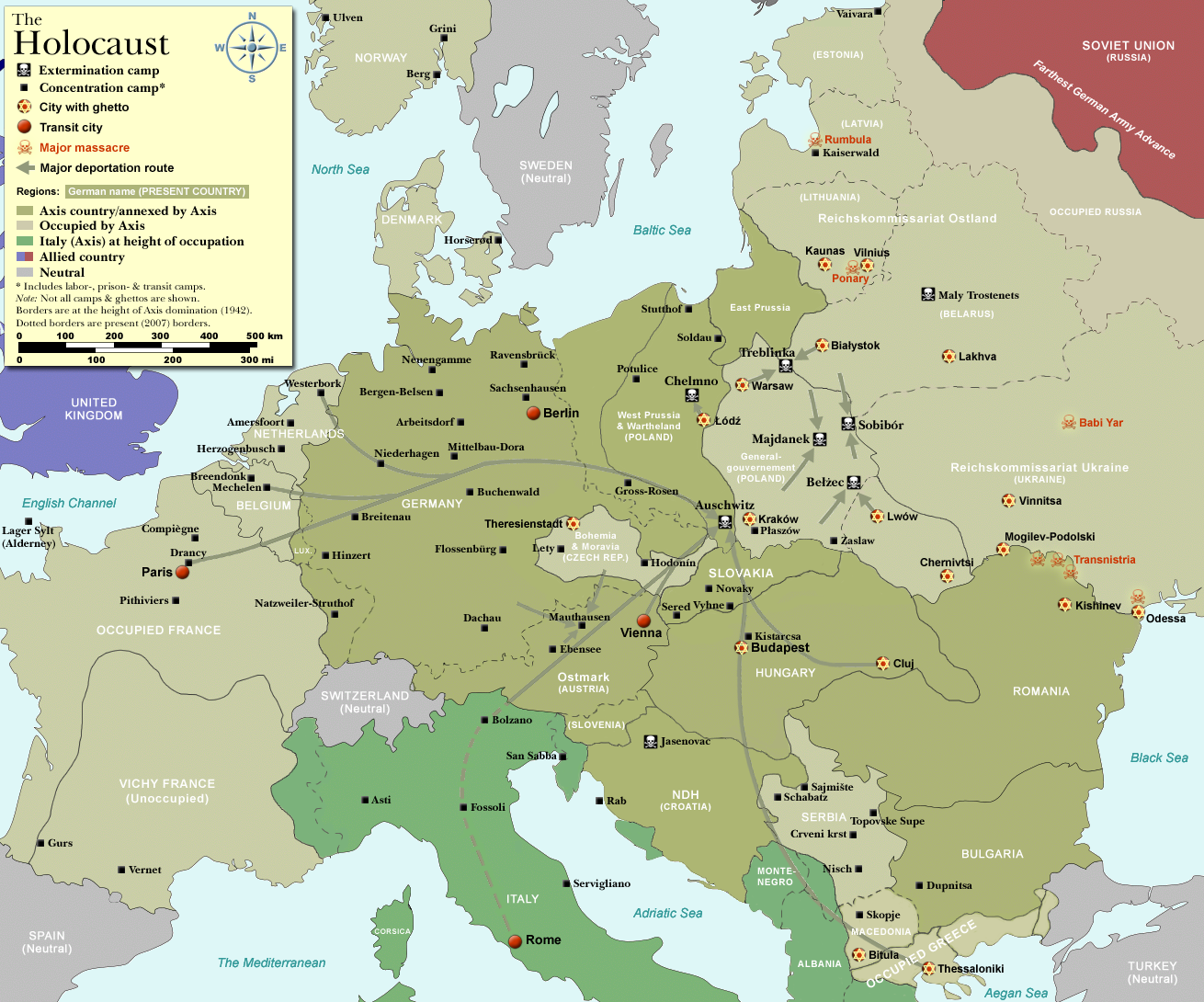
Map of the Holocaust in Europe during World War II, 1939–1945. This map shows all German Nazi extermination camps (or death camps), most major concentration camps, labor camps, prison camps, ghettos, major deportation routes and major massacre sites.

During World War II, the new category of Nazi ghettos was formed by the Third Reich in order to confine Jews into tightly packed areas of the cities of Eastern and Central Europe. They served as staging points to begin dividing "able workers" from those who would later be deemed unworthy of life. In many cases, the Nazi-era ghettos did not correspond to historic Jewish quarters. For example, the Kraków Ghetto was formally established in the Podgórze district, not in the Jewish district of Kazimierz. As a result, the displaced ethnic Polish families were forced to take up residences outside.

In 1942, the Nazis began Operation Reinhard, the systematic deportation to extermination camps during the Holocaust. The authorities deported Jews from everywhere in Europe to the ghettos of the East, or directly to the extermination camps designed and operated in Poland by Nazi Germans. There were no Polish guards at any of the camps, despite the sometimes used misnomer Polish death camps.

== By country ==
=== Austria ===
- During World War II, an open type ghetto holding over 65,000 Jews was set up in the district of Leopoldstadt, Vienna. Most were deported to concentration camps and death factories, only 2,000 survived.

=== Soviet Belarus ===
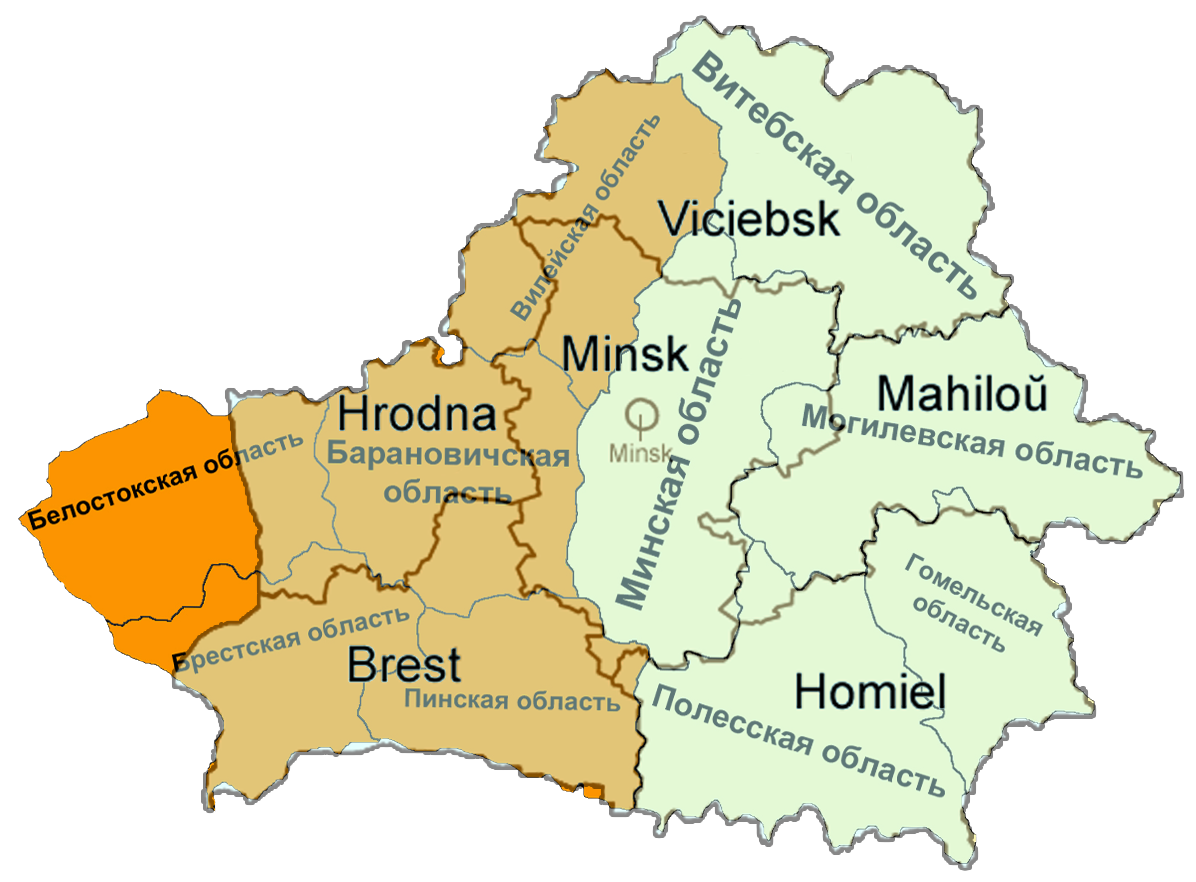
Soviet Belarus before World War II in green. Marked in shades of orange, the territories of Poland annexed by the Soviet Union in 1939 overlaid with subdivisions of present-day Belarus

Following the Nazi German Operation Barbarossa of 1941, the ghettos were set up first in the prewar Polish cities within the territories of Poland annexed by the Soviet Union during the Soviet invasion of Poland in 1939 (in accordance with Nazi-Soviet Pact). They included:

- Brześć Ghetto, occupied Poland, holding 18,000 Jews, modern Brest, Belarus
- Łachwa Ghetto, occupied Poland, holding 2,350 Jews, modern Lakhva, Belarus
- Pińsk Ghetto, occupied Poland, holding 26,000 Jews, modern Pinsk, Belarus
- Słonim Ghetto, occupied Poland, holding 22,000–25,000 Jews, modern Slonim, Belarus
- Zdzięcioł Ghetto, occupied Poland, holding over 4,500 Jews, the site of the Dzyatlava massacre, modern Dzyatlava, Belarus

The Nazi ghettos set up in Soviet Belarus within the borders of the Soviet Union from before the Nazi-Soviet invasion of Poland existed in almost all larger cities; which comprise the territories of East Belarus since the Revolutions of 1989. They included:

- Minsk Ghetto in Minsk, today's capital of the Republic of Belarus, holding 100,000 Jews
- Bobruisk Ghetto Babruysk holding 25,000 Jews
- Vitebsk Ghetto Vitebsk holding 20,000 Jews
- Mogilev Ghetto Mogilev holding 12,000 Jews
- Gomel Ghetto in Gomel holding over 10,000 Jews; in Gomel Region alone, twenty ghettos were established in which no less than 21,000 people were imprisoned.
- Slutsk Ghetto Slutsk holding 10,000 Jews
- Borisov Ghetto Barysaw holding 8,000 Jews
- Polotsk Ghetto Polotsk holding 8,000 Jews.

=== Croatia ===
==== Dubrovnik ====
Established in 1546 by the former Republic of Ragusa.

==== Split ====
Established in 1738 by the former Republic of Venice.

=== Czech Republic ===
- Josefov, Prague; formerly the Jewish ghetto
- Jewish Quarter of Trebic

==== The Holocaust ====
- Theresienstadt Ghetto

=== France ===
- Avignon

=== Germany ===
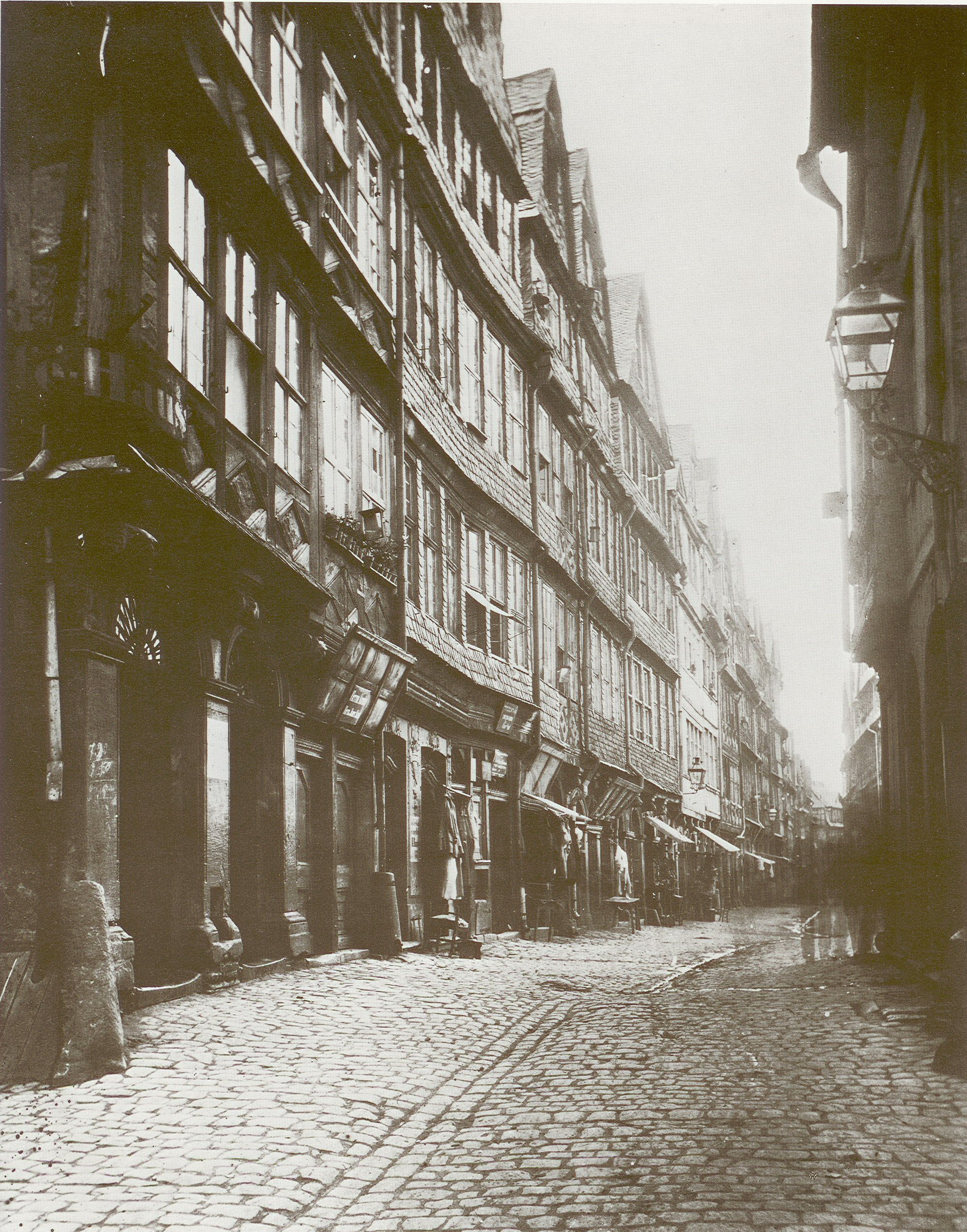
Frankfurter Judengasse in 1868

==== Frankfurt ====
From its creation to its dissolution at the end of the 18th century, the city councils limited expansion in the Judengasse, resulting in a steady increase in population to the point of overcrowding. The original area of about a dozen houses with around 100 inhabitants, grew to almost 200 houses and some 3,000 inhabitants. The plots, originally quite generous, were successively divided while the total size of the ghetto remained the same. This increased the number of plots but subsequently reduced the size of each plot. In the process, many houses were replaced by two or more houses which were often divided in turn. Many of the houses were designed to be narrow and long, in order to maximize the limited space – the smallest house, the Rote Hase, was only about one and a half meters wide.

==== Friedberg ====
Jewish settlement during the Middle Ages all across the town, but since 1360 following a number of pogroms concentrating on the Judengasse (Jew's Row), running parallel to the main street.

==== The Third Reich and World War II ====
At the beginning of World War II, nearly a quarter of the pre-war Polish areas were annexed by Nazi Germany and placed directly under German civil administration, in violation of international law (in particular, the Hague Convention IV 1907). Nazi Germany organized ghettos in many occupied countries, but the ghettos in the new Reichsgaue including Reichsgau Danzig-West Prussia and Reichsgau Wartheland were particularly notorious. The Łódź/Litzmannstadt Ghetto holding 204,000 prisoners existed in a Polish city annexed to Germany; numerous others included Będzin Ghetto, Sosnowiec Ghetto, and the ghetto in Koło.

=== Hungary ===
- Ghetto Erzsébetváros, Budapest

At the turn of the 18th and 19th century the Jewish community gathered in the 7th district along the road leading to the bridge, with Király Street as its center. The city had not tolerated Jewish people for a long time. Joseph II’s regulation put an end to the prohibition in 1783. At that time there lived fourteen Jewish families in the immediate vicinity of Budapest, in the great mansion of Barons Orczy. Their numbers increased rapidly. Most of the largest Jewish community of the era moved from Óbuda, but many of them came from other areas of the Habsburg empire.

In 1944 the Pest Ghetto was built here in the neighborhood bordered by Király Street, Csányi Street, Klauzál Square, Kisdiófa Street, Dohány Street and Károly Boulevard, crowding 70,000 people together. One of the borders of the ghetto was the Row of Archways on the Wesselényi Street side. In 2002 this area was named the old Jewish neighborhood of Pest and was entered into the Budapest world heritage conservation zone. This area features most of the Jewish heritage sites of the Pest side, including the famous "Synagogue Triangle."

=== Italy ===
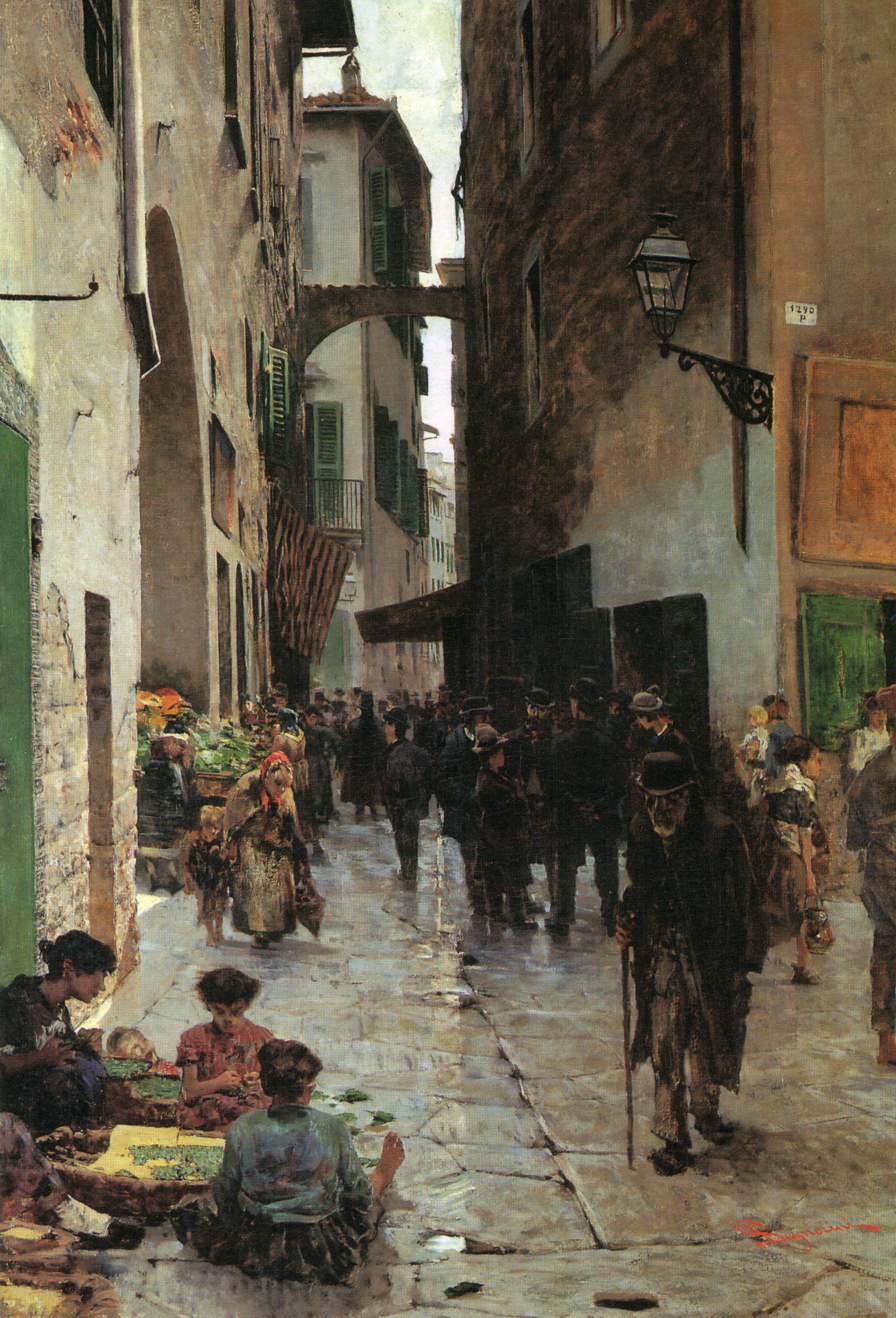
Ghetto of Florence, T. Signorini, 1882

==== Mantua ====
In 1590, Vincenzo Gonzaga expelled all foreign-born Jews from Mantua; in 1602, he forbade Jewish physicians from treating Christian patients without special permission; in 1610 he established a ghetto, and in 1612 compelled all Jews to live in it. In 1610 Jews constituted about 7.5 percent of the population of Mantua. In 1630 the Mantua ghetto was sacked by imperial troops and destroyed. Among the Jewish dead or missing were the composer Salamone Rossi and his sister the opera singer Madama Europa.

==== Padua ====
The first Jewish congregation was established in Padua around 1300, but the community was largely self-segregating until the establishment of an official ghetto in 1603, extant until 1797, when invading French troops destroyed it. Jewish residents were required to wear various items denoting status--a yellow patch and, later, yellow and then red berets. Some wealthy Jews were able to live outside the ghetto and "evade the rules about wearing the Jewish badge." Jewish physicians were not required to wear the yellow or red beret. Padua's Jews were often dealers in secondhand goods.

Located south of Piazza delle Erbe, in an area where there were already two synagogues (the Italian rite synagogue, still in operation) and a German-rite synagogue; a third synagogue, Sephardic, was built in 1617 and active until 1892.) Modeled on the Venetian ghetto. the walls of the Padua ghetto had four doors, each guarded by a Jew and a Christian; two were on Via San Martino e Solferino, one on Via dell'Arco, and one on Via delle Piazze. The ghetto was in center of town and close to city markets.

The first case of plague in the Paduan ghetto appeared during the High Holy Days in 1631 (5390/5391), resulting in the deaths of 421 of the 721 residents.

Paduans attacked the ghetto many times, including a six-day assault in August 1684, which was famously recorded by Isaac Chayyim Cantarini. According to some sources, the 1684 attack began on Tisha B'Av. Christian university students were a particular problem, regularly attacking ghetto residents, and student violence against Jews was common on the first day of snowfall each year until the custom was abolished in 1633. Christian medical students also stole Jewish cadavers.

Traces of the hinges of the ghetto doors can be seen on the western wall of the church of San Canziano and on a building located at Via San Martino e Solferino and Via Roma, where there also remain plaques in Latin and Hebrew reminding Jews to retreat to the ghetto after sunset. The Jewish Heritage Museum of Padua is located at 26 via delle Plazze, on the site of the former German-rite synagogue, the Scuola Grande.

==== Piedmont ====
- Some ancient ghettos in Piedmont, where Judæo-Piedmontese (a kind of Piedmontese language with Hebrew words) was spoken: Turin, Moncalvo, Vercelli, Casale Monferrato, Alessandria, Asti, Ivrea, Carmagnola, Bra, Nicastro

==== Papal States ====
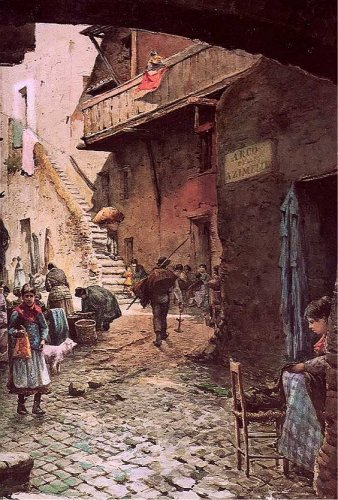
An 1880 watercolor of the Roman Ghetto by Ettore Roesler Franz.

- Ghetto of Ancona, established in 1555 by the Cum nimis absurdum of Pope Paul IV. The inhabitants of the ghetto were the richest Jewish merchants of the Papal States.
- Ghetto of Ferrara, established in 1627.
- Roman Ghetto, created in 1555 by Pope Paul IV. His papal bull Cum nimis absurdum confined Jews of Rome to live in a part of the Rione Sant'Angelo, the most undesirable area of the city, being subject to constant flooding by the Tiber River. At the time of its founding, the four-block area contained about 1,000 inhabitants. However, over time, the Jewish community grew, which caused severe overcrowding. Since the area could not expand horizontally (the ghetto was surrounded by high walls), the Jews built upwards, which blocked the sun from reaching the already dank and narrow streets. Life in the Roman Ghetto was one of crushing poverty, due to the severe restrictions placed upon the professions and occupations that Jews were allowed to perform. The Roman Ghetto was the last of the original ghettos to be abolished in Western Europe. In 1870, the Kingdom of Italy took Rome from the Pope and the ghetto was finally opened, with the walls themselves being torn down in 1888.
- Ghetto of Urbino, established in 1631.

==== Venice ====
Although there is evidence indicating the presence of Jews in the Venetian area dating back to the first few centuries AD, during the 15th and early 16th centuries (until 1516), no Jew was allowed to live anywhere in the city of Venice for more than 15 days per year; so most of them lived in Venice's possessions on the terrafirma. At its maximum, the population of the ghetto reached 3,000. In exchange for their loss of freedom, the Jews were granted the right to a Jew's coat (the colour yellow was considered humiliating, as it was associated with prostitutes). The gates were locked at night, and the Jewish community was forced to pay the salaries of the patrolmen who guarded the gates and patrolled the canals that surrounded the ghetto. The ghetto was abolished after the fall of the Republic of Venice to Napoleon.

==== Sicily ====
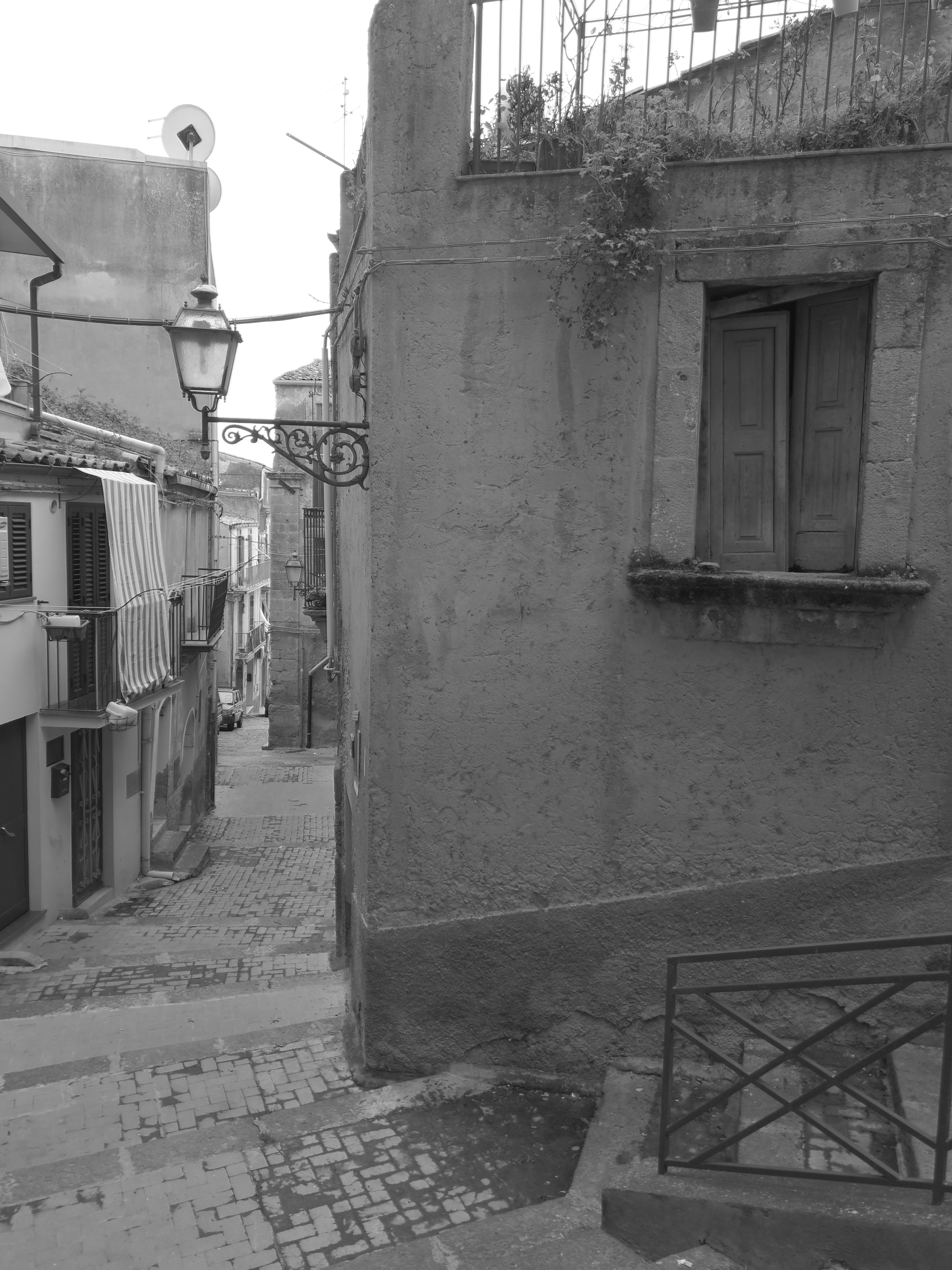
Jewish quarter "Giudecca" or "Iudeca" Caltagirone, Italy

The Sicilian Jews lived in medieval neighborhoods. The Sicilian Jewish quarter giudecche were abandoned by their inhabitants at the end of the Medieval Era because the expulsion of the Jews from Sicily in 1493.

==== Southern Italy ====
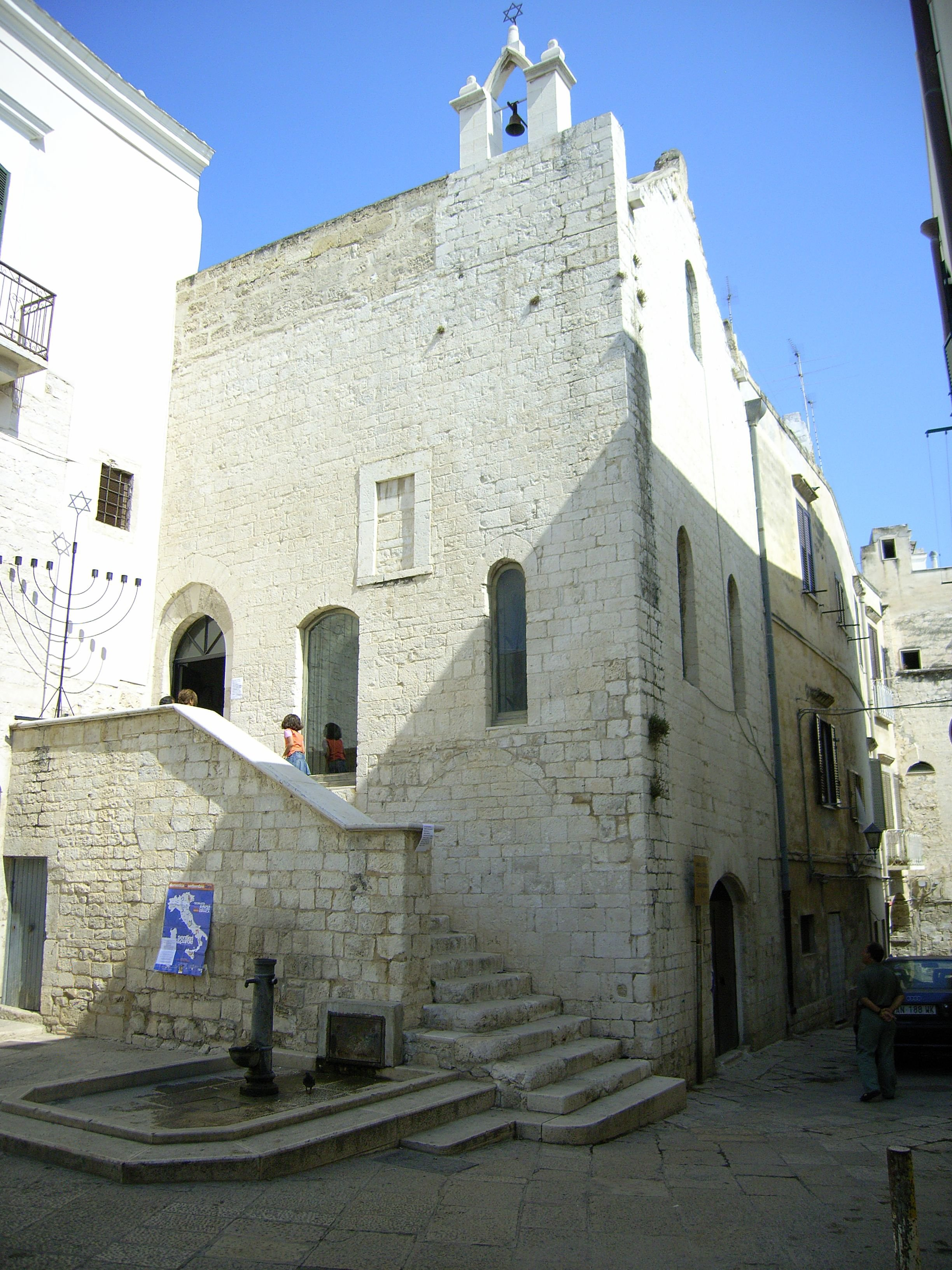
Scolanova is one of the four synagogue of Trani built in the 13th century

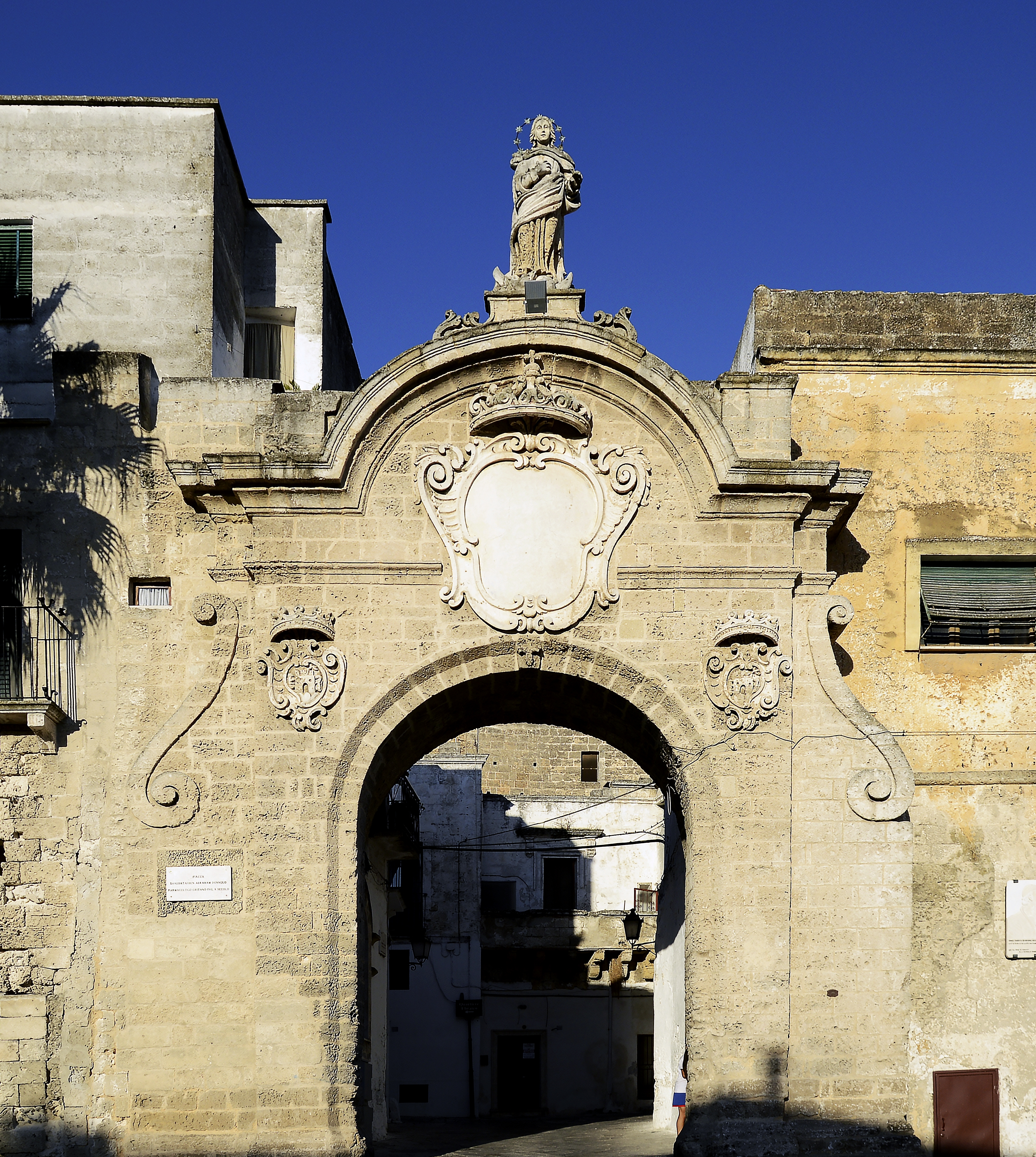
Porta degli ebrei was the gate of the rione giudea, the Jewish quarter in Oria.

While not exactly ghettos, the giudecche of southern Italy were medieval and Early Modern Jewish quarters. The Jews of the region often lived in these neighborhoods either for safety reasons or by the compulsion of Christian authorities. After the expulsion of the Jews from the Kingdom of Naples in 1541, these neighborhoods lost their distinctive Jewish character, and now only traces of evidence remain of the original inhabitants. There were Jewish quarters known as giudecche in Abruzzo, Basilicata, Campania, Calabria, Molise and Apulia.

=== Poland ===
For centuries, Poland was home to one of the largest and most significant Jewish communities in the world. Polish monarchs of the Piast dynasty invited the Jews to the country awarding them rights of status and total religious tolerance. By the mid-16th century, 80% of the world's Jews lived in Poland. Thanks to a long period of Polish statutory religious tolerance and social autonomy, the immigration of Jews to Poland began to increase already during the Crusades because of systemic persecution of Jews in Western Europe. Jewish settlers built their own settlements in Poland. By the mid-14th century they had occupied thirty-five towns in Silesia alone. The Catholic Church, however, was opposed to the tolerant attitude of the Polish royalty. The 1266 council of Breslau applied the Fourth Council of the Lateran limitations on the Jews to the Roman Catholic Archdiocese of Gniezno, forbidding side-by-side life of Jews and Christians and setting up Jewish ghettos. In large cities, residential quarters were assigned to them, as found, for example, in Kazimierz, later a prominent district of Kraków. In the Kazimierz city, a 34-acre "Jewish Town" was set up by king Jan I Olbracht in 1495 for the relocation of Jews from Kraków Old Town after a citywide fire. Kraków's Kazimierz is one of the finest examples of an old Jewish quarter to be found anywhere in the world. The Jewish quarter was governed by its own municipal form of Jewish self-government called kehilla, a foundation of the local qahal. In smaller Polish towns, ethnic communities were mostly integrated.

==== The Holocaust ====
Nearly complete genocidal destruction of the Polish Jewish community took place during the German occupation of Poland and the ensuing Holocaust. The World War II ghetto-system had been imposed by Nazi Germany roughly between October 1939 and July 1942 in order to confine Poland's Jewish population of 3.5 million for the purpose of persecution, terror, and exploitation. The Warsaw Ghetto was the largest ghetto in all of Nazi occupied Europe, with over 400,000 Jews crammed into an area of 1.3 square miles (3.4 km^{2}), or 7.2 persons per room. The Łódź Ghetto (set up in the city of Łódź, renamed Litzmannstadt, in the territories of Poland annexed by Nazi Germany) was the second largest, holding about 160,000 inmates. Over three million Polish Jews perished in World War II, resulting in the destruction of an entire civilization.

The Warsaw ghetto contained more Jews than all of France; the Lodz ghetto more Jews than all of the Netherlands. More Jews lived in the city of Cracow than in all of Italy, and virtually any medium-sized town in Poland had a larger Jewish population than all of Scandinavia. All of southeast Europe – Hungary, Romania, Bulgaria, Yugoslavia, and Greece – had fewer Jews than the original four districts of the General Government. — Christopher Browning

The page List of Jewish ghettos in German-occupied Poland contains a list of over 280 ghettos with approximate numbers of prisoners, dates of creation and liquidation, as well as known deportation routes to death camps.

Holocaust in occupied Poland: the map

Starting in 1939, Adolf Eichmann, a German Nazi and SS officer began to systematically move Polish Jews away from their homes and into designated areas of large Polish cities. The first large ghetto of World War II at Piotrków Trybunalski was established on October 8, 1939, followed by the Łódź Ghetto in April 1940, the Warsaw Ghetto in October 1940, and many other ghettos established throughout 1940 and 1941. The ghettos were walled off, and any Jew found leaving them was shot.

The situation in the ghettos was usually brutal. In Warsaw, 30% of the population were forced to live in 2.4% of the city's area. In the ghetto of Odrzywol, 700 people lived in an area previously occupied by 5 families, between 12 and 30 to each small room. The Jews were not allowed out of the ghetto, so they had to rely on replenishments supplied by the Nazis: in Warsaw this was 181 calories per Jew, compared to 669 calories per non-Jewish Pole and 2,613 calories per German. With crowded living conditions, starvation diets, and little sanitation (in the Łódź Ghetto 95% of apartments had no sanitation, piped water or sewers) hundreds of thousands of Jews died of disease and starvation.

The liquidation of WWII ghettos across Poland was closely connected with the formation of highly secretive killing centers built by various German companies including I.A. Topf and Sons of Erfurt, and C.H. Kori GmbH. 254,000–300,000 Jews were deported from the Warsaw Ghetto alone to Treblinka extermination camp over the course of 52 days during Grossaktion Warsaw (1942). In some of the ghettos the local resistance organizations launched the ghetto uprisings; none were successful, and the Jewish populations of the ghettos were almost entirely killed. Jews from Eastern Poland (areas now in Lithuania, Belarus, Ukraine) were killed using guns rather than in gas chambers, see Ponary massacre, Janowska concentration camp.

=== Spain ===
- Call Jueu de Girona, Girona
- Call Jueu de Barcelona, Barcelona
- Plasencia

Phase-wise segregation of the Jewish population from an intermixed settling throughout the Middle Ages until the Expulsion of the Jews from Spain in 1492.

=== The Netherlands ===
- Jodenbreestraat ("Jewish Broad Street"), Amsterdam

Jodebreestraat was a street "in the very heart of the Jewish quarter." In the mid 15th century the Ashkenazi Jews began to arrive in Amsterdam in large numbers from Germany and Eastern Europe – especially Ukraine, where 40,000 to 100,000 Jews had been slaughtered by Zaporozhian Cossacks and Ukrainian peasants during the Khmelnytsky Uprising. By the 18th century there were 20,000 Ashkenazi Jews and 3,000 Sephardic Jews in Amsterdam. Non-Jewish people also lived in Jewish neighborhoods, for example Rembrandt van Rijn.

Following the Nazi German invasion of the Netherlands, in February 1941 the Hebrew quarter was completely sealed off and a ghetto was established. The first group of 425 Jewish men were assembled at the Jonas Daniel Meijer Square and sent to concentration camps at Buchenwald and Mauthausen, which resulted in mass demonstrations among gentiles, organized by the Dutch Workers Party. However, the deportation of Jews to Nazi death camps continued until the end of World War II. Amsterdam had 3 Jewish neighborhoods before 1940, one in the Center, one in Amsterdam East and one in Amsterdam South. The one in the Center of Amsterdam was closed off from February 12, 1941, to May 6, 1941, with barbed wire, and guarded bridges that were open.

=== Turkey ===
- Balat, European Istanbul

== See also ==
- Pale of Settlement, the territory where the Jews were permitted to live in the Russian Empire
- Kishinev Ghetto (1941–1942), Jewish ghetto in Kishinev, USSR
- Shtetl, predominantly Jewish small town in Eastern Europe
