= Ulrich Konrad =

German musicologist

- Born: Ulrich Aloysius Konrad; 14 August 1957 (age 69); Bonn
- Occupation: Musicologist
- Title: Senior professor
- Awards: Gottfried Wilhelm Leibniz Prize; Order of Merit of the Federal Republic of Germany

Academic background
- Education: University of Bonn; University of Vienna
- Thesis: Otto Nicolai (1810–1849): Studien zu Leben und Werk (1984)

Academic work
- Discipline: Musicology
- Institutions: Hochschule für Musik Freiburg; University of Würzburg
- Doctoral students: Elam Rotem

Ulrich Aloysius Konrad (born 14 August 1957) is a German musicologist and professor at the Institute for Music Research of the University of Würzburg. He is considered an expert on European music of the 17th to 20th centuries, especially the works of Mozart, Robert Schumann, Richard Wagner and Richard Strauss. He wrote a biography, Wolfgang Amadé Mozart, and studied the composer's sketches.

== Career ==
Born in Bonn, Konrad studied musicology, German studies and history at the Universities of Bonn and Vienna. His doctoral thesis in 1983 dealt with the composer and conductor Otto Nicolai, who influenced the composition and performance practice of the orchestra in the middle of the 19th century with the founding of the Vienna Philharmonic. After Konrad's habilitation in 1991 at the University of Göttingen with a study on Mozart's creative style, he taught as a professor of musicology at the Hochschule für Musik Freiburg in Freiburg im Breisgau from 1993, and in 1996 became professor of musicology at the University of Würzburg. He is chairman of the Academy for Mozart Research of the Mozarteum University Salzburg, and project manager of the Robert Schumann Complete Edition and of the Edition Richard Wagner Schriften (RWS).

== Research ==
Konrad studied Mozart's work intensively. His biography, Wolfgang Amadé Mozart, appeared in 2005, published by Bärenreiter. Looking at sketches and fragments, Konrad was able to draw conclusions about Mozart's method of composition. He found that Mozart planned his compositions much more thoroughly than previously assumed, going through several stages of development. He published these findings in a monograph in 1991 and also published annotated editions of all of Mozart's sketches and fragments.

Konad has also dealt with instrumental ensemble music of the 17th century and with the history and methodology of musicology.

== Honours ==
In 1996 Konrad was awarded the Dent Medal. In January 1999 he received the Silver Mozart Medal of the International Mozarteum Foundation Salzburg for his standard work on Mozart's creative style and his complete edition of Mozart's sketches. In 2001 Konrad was the first and so far only musicologist to receive the Gottfried Wilhelm Leibniz Prize.

Konrad is a member of the Bavarian Academy of Sciences and Humanities, the Academy of Sciences Leopoldina and the Academia Europaea as well as correspondent member of the Akademie der Wissenschaften zu Göttingen and the Akademie der Wissenschaften und der Literatur. In 2017 he received the Officer's Cross of the Order of Merit of the Federal Republic of Germany.

== Publications ==
- Konrad, Ulrich (2004). Johann Sebastian Bach im Wien der Schubert-Zeit : Akademievorlesung, gehalten am 13. Januar 2004 (in German). Hamburg Göttingen: Joachim Jungius-Gesellschaft der Wissenschaften In Kommission beim Verlag Vandenhoeck & Ruprecht. ISBN 978-3-525-86328-2. OCLC 57730242.
- Konrad, Ulrich (2014). Werkstattblicke : Haydn, Beethoven und Wagner beim Komponieren beobachtet (in German). Mainz Stuttgart: Akademie der Wissenschaften und der Literatur Steiner. ISBN 978-3-515-10823-2. OCLC 885181033.
- (as editor: Kirchenmusikalisches Jahrbuch des Allgemeiner Cäcilien-Verband für Deutschland, Regensburg.
- Zwischen Exzellenzinitiative und Massenbetrieb: Quo vadis Universität, in KDStV Cheruscia Würzburg-Blätter. volume 92, 2015, pp. 12–22.
