= Madama Europa =

Italian opera singer

Madama Europa was the nickname of Europa Rossi (fl. 1600), a soprano opera singer, the first Jewish opera singer to achieve widespread fame outside of the Jewish community.

She was the sister of the Jewish violinist and composer Salamone Rossi who is known to have been employed at Mantua from 1587 to 1628.

Some scholars argued that she took her name from appearances in the mythical role of Europa in an intermezzo before 1600 at the court of the Dukes of Mantua. However, Newman points out that the name "Madama Europa" is listed already before 1600 among the salaried employees of the Mantuan court; he therefore assumes that Rossi's sister had already appeared as "Europa" in an earlier Intermezzo". Liza Malamut has recently proven that her name was indeed Europa.

She probably died with her brother in the War of the Mantuan Succession, when, following the fall of Mantua to the Austrian troops of the Holy Roman Empire, imperial soldiers sacked the Jewish ghetto.
