= Profeti della Quinta =

Male vocal ensemble

- Origin: Basel, Switzerland
- Genres: Renaissance and Baroque music
- Years active: 2009–present
- Website: www.quintaprofeti.com

Profeti della Quinta (Prophets of the Perfect Fifth) is a male vocal ensemble, specializing in the music of the Renaissance and Baroque periods. Founded in the Galilee region of Israel by Elam Rotem, the ensemble is currently based in Basel, Switzerland, where its members undertook advanced studies at the Schola Cantorum Basiliensis. The core of the ensemble includes countertenor, tenor and bass singers, who perform either a-cappella or together with period instruments such as theorbo and harpsichord.

The ensemble released its first CD, dedicated to Hebrew music by Salamone Rossi in 2009. In summer 2011 the ensemble won the York Early Music International Young Artists competition at the (NCEM), propelling its international career. In the same year, the ensemble made its debut at the Utrecht Oude Muziek festival and took part in a documentary film about Salomone Rossi, directed by Joseph Rochlitz and filmed in Rossi's hometown of Mantua, Italy. The ensemble has since performed in prestigious festivals and venues in Europe, such as the Konzerthaus Berlin, Printemps des Arts in Nantes, Handel Festival Göttingen, Rheingau Musik Festival, York early music Festival and the Festtage Alte Musik Basel. Further concerts took the ensemble to Israel, Finland, Poland, Belgium, Austria, Italy and other European countries. In 2013 the ensemble made its debut in Canada, followed by concert tours in Japan and USA. Concerts by the ensemble were broadcast by major classical radio stations, such as BBC3, France Musique and DRS2 Switzerland.

In addition to the Hebrew and Italian music of Salomone Rossi, ensemble Profeti della Quinta has performed the Lamentations by Emilio de' Cavalieri, as well as programs dedicated to the Italian Madrigal repertoire. Among the special ventures of the ensemble is the biblical drama Rappresentatione di Giuseppe e i suoi fratelli / Joseph and his Brethren, composed by Elam Rotem, which was performed in Israel and Switzerland and released on CD by Pan Classics in 2014. The ensemble has cooperated with leading figures in the field of early music, such as Andreas Scholl and Skip Sempe, and instrumental groups such as Lautten Compagney Berlin, Accademia Daniel, the Jerusalem Baroque Orchestra, Dolce Risonanza and Capriccio Stravagante.

== Discography ==
- Salomone Rossi: The Song of Solomon, 2009 Pan Classics PC 10214
- Hebreo: The Search for Salomone Rossi, DVD 2012 Lasso Film & TV Production
- Wege zum Barock, 2013 Cantando
- Salomone Rossi: Il Mantovano Hebreo, 2013 Linn Records CKD429
- Elam Rotem: Rappresentatione di Giuseppe e i suoi fratelli, 2CD 2014 Pan Classics PC 10302
- Orlando di Lasso: Musica Reservata, 2015 Pan Classics PC 10323
- Elam Rotem: Quia Amore Langueo, 2015 Pan Classics PC 10321
- Luzzasco Luzzaschi: Madrigals, Motets, and Instrumental Music, 2016 Pan Classics PC 10350
- Amor, Fortuna et Morte: Madrigals by Cipriano de Rore, Luzzasco Luzzaschi, Carlo Gesualdo & Claudio Monteverdi, 2019 Pan Classics PC 10396
- Philippe Verdelot: Madrigals for four voices, 2021 Pan Classics PC 10422
