= Jewish western art music =

Art Music

The Jewish western art music is the art music which is created for performing and singing in a synagogue and is similar to the creation of church music known as classical music. Musical composition of verses for service is used for playing in liturgical events, holidays and shabbats as well as para- liturgical service events such as: weddings, Brit Milahs, and other performances with a Religious ground motive.

This music was played among Jewish communities in Italy in Avignon of France and in the city of Amsterdam during the 17th and 18th centuries. The music is an organized language in notes, composed and artistically printed, then presented to professional singers and instruments players to practice and perform in front of an audience. Hence, it is considered artistic music and not folk music. The Western Jewish Art Music sounds very much like the western non-Jewish one, and is written according to the western style principles of the period its created in. As such, this phenomenon was controversial, and highly criticized among the Jewish communities where it was performed.

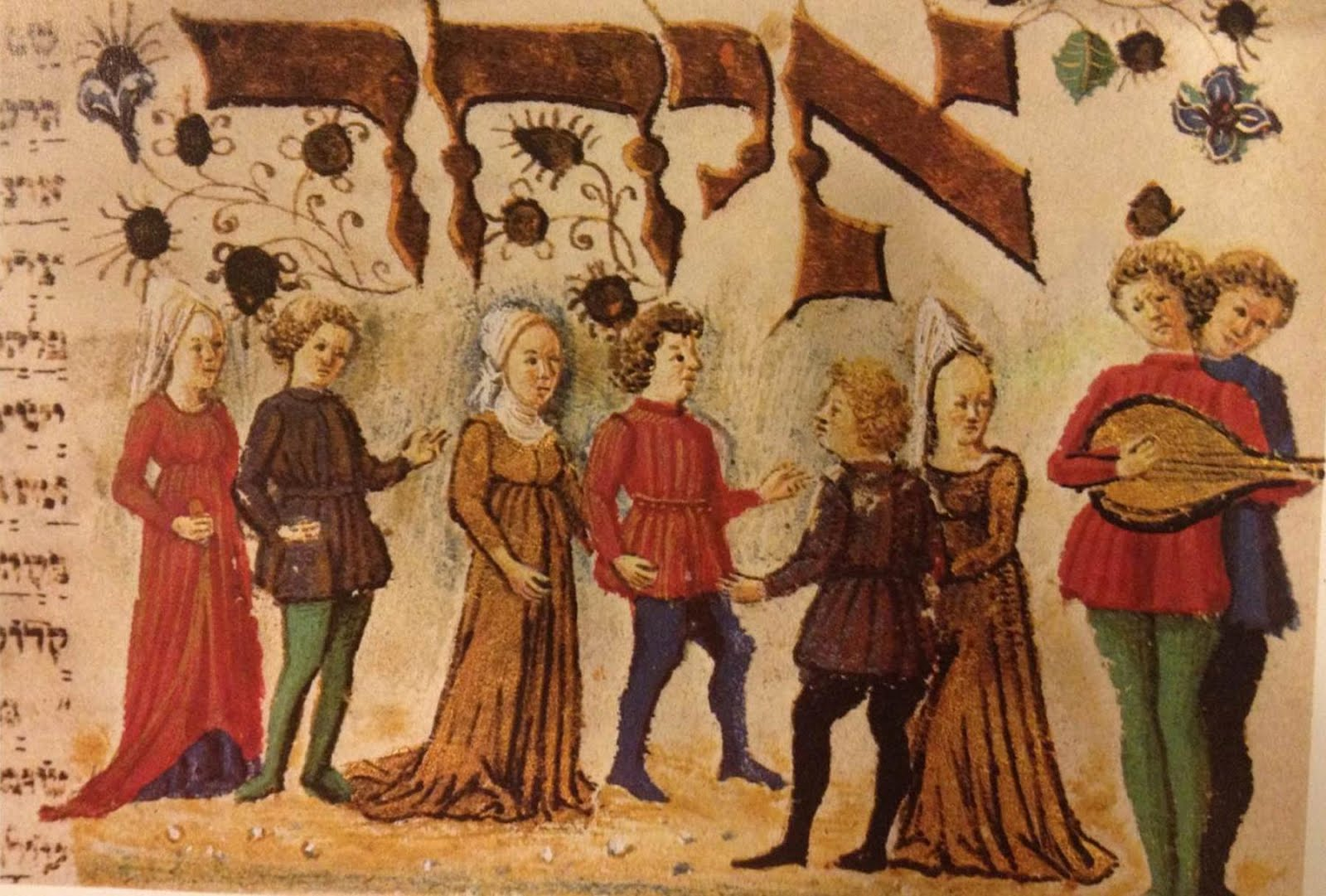
Jewish couple dances of the 15th century. On the right – a Lute player and singer.

== History ==
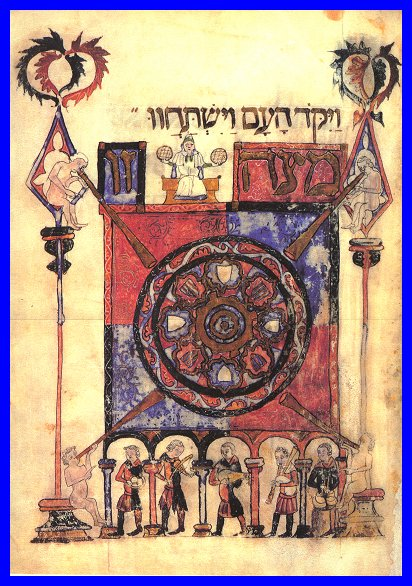
"Barcelona Haggadah" from the 14th century, with western music instrument

- Jewish music composition according to the western artistic theory of the period was initially documented in western musical notes. Evidence of 12th century's musical notes was found in the Cairo Genizah and was written by the Normandyian Obadiah the Proselyte. These musical notes are the earliest (most ancient) musical written document owned by a synagogue.
- During the 16th and 17th centuries the renaissance culture was greatly widespread, and consequently, it influenced the Jewish community. One of the effects of it was on the performance of art music in synagogues. The Jewish people, who didn't feel comfortable to be part of a less developed culture, have started building big synagogues, beautifully structured, and gorgeously magnificently decorated with fine art, not less than the next door churches in Casale Monferrato, Florence, Venice and in Rome. the outstanding composer of that period was the Italian composer Salamone Rossi. He was well known thanks to his great contribution to the art music played in synagogues. First signs of art music in the synagogues were revealed in Padua (Between the years of 1555 till 1565), in Ferrara (1605), Mantuna (from 1610 till 1612) and in Venice (in about 1628). During this period, due to the Counter-Reformation, the Jews were pushed to ghettos in Italy. Apparently, the Jewish communities being transformed to ghettos and the rise of art music synagogue not only overlap in time, but also have a causality relation.
- In the middle of the 17th century, the beginning of the middle Baroque period, performing art music was common in many synagogues in Italy. We know that thanks to the writings of Yehudah Mi-modena who quoted the words of Nethanel Trabot from 1645 about the music which is played and sung in synagogues while Jews worship god. Researchers found evidence of art music being a common component and institutionalized in the cultural life of the Jewish ghettos in Italy
- The descendants of Anusim (crypto-Jews) from Spain and Portugal who had settled in Amsterdam in the late 16th century have become one of the most prosperous communities in Europe during the 17th and 18th centuries. These crypto-Jews who returned to the Judaism, assimilated Christian culture in the years that they were living as a Christian. The admixture of Jewish people who hide their true identity, living as Christian, belonging to high society, and having the need to create art resulted in many art works in various fields.
- The only Jewish community left in France after the 1394 Expulsion from France were the Provence Jewish community. Since they weren't expelled, they had an opportunity to develop a rich community culture. One of the remaining of this community is of great worth – The Kantata for a Brith

== Musical background ==
Combining music in religious ceremonies is a common costume in the human culture. The influence music has on its listeners is mentioned in the Byble on different occasions. Three examples of that are:

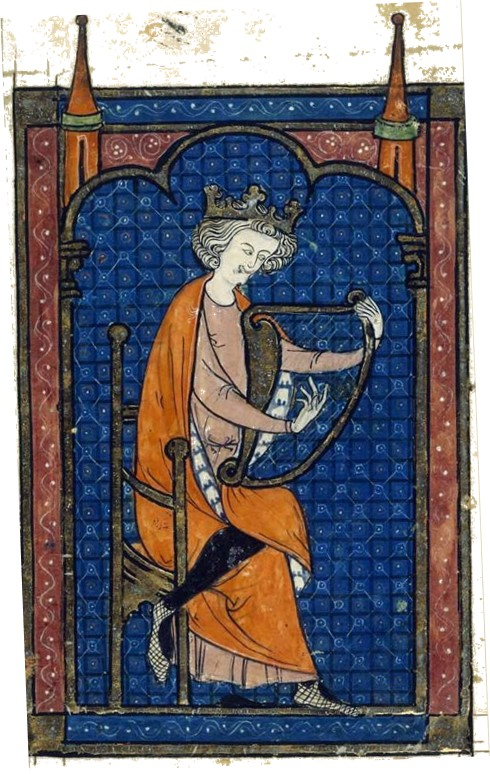
David's playing the harp.

- In the book of Psalms- the Tribe of Levi singing at the Temple in Jerusalem. (Psalms, chapter 92, 4th verse)
- In the story of king Saul who invited David to play music for him.
- in the story of the battle between the three kings: the King of Judah, the king of Israel, Jehoram and the king of Edom who fought against Moab, the son of Lot. The water was running out, and so before they went to the fight, Jehoram pleaded Elisha the Prophet to prophesy and create water. Elish in return, demanded to use the power of music with which he managed to provide water.

The Masoretes who strived to create uniformity to the Jewish prayer invented the nikkud (Hebrew vocalization) and Cantillation, which later became a significant layer for the Jewish prayer standardization. However, the Cantillation versions differ, therefore it is not possible to know the tune that it was sung in the period it was written. Similar phenomena have occurred in the Christian Church. During Charlemagne's period in the 9th century, Due to the requirement of the Church to unify all versions of the Christian prayer early musical notes have been invented, which revolutionized the world of western music: it created a unified language understandable to anyone who acquired the knowledge of music notation.

Music notation is the system used to visually represent aurally perceived music through the use of written symbols. Since its creation, the western music has developed and become a significant language for western music documentation. The voices and harmony arrangement elements as well as the various components it has, are an important element in the justification given for performing a western-style music in the synagogue.

== Obadiah the Proselyte ==
The issue of Obadiah the Proselyte in the music field is still being researched. 3 melodies which are Genizah fragments in the Cairo Geniza are being held at Cambridge University and at Jewish Theological Seminary of America library in New York city. These tunes were written in the neumes musical notes by Obadiah the Proselyte in the first half of the 12th century. These characters are the earliest musical written work from a synagogue written in western notes which can be read by means known to music scholars.

Obadiah the Proselyte was a Christian member of the nobility who converted to Judaism and was familiar with writing music using musical notation. One of the findings is a musical performance segment of biblical texts, which he probably learned from one of the Near East communities where he stayed following his conversion in the year of 1102. Among the melodies is "Who's on Mount horev" which sounds similar to Gregorian chant music style.

== The songs of Salamone ==
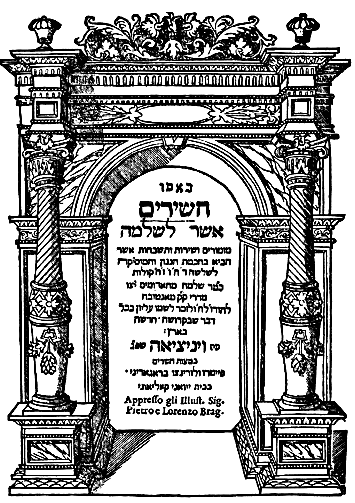
"Hashirim asher le Shlomo" 1st cover

The Jewish composer Salamone Rossi was Mantua's Gonzaga family court composer from the late 16th century till the 1630s (early Baroque period) who wrote secular music. His book The songs of Salamone ("Hashirim asher l'Shlomo") is one of the earliest writings of synagogue music. In the introduction to the book he describes the sequence of events which led to its publication, where he raises the controversial issue of performing non-religious music in his period style in a synagogue. He emphasises that the songs are composed according to the wisdom of the western music harmony style of the late Renaissance and early Baroque period. He also documents the number of voices in these compositions.
