= Salamone Rossi =

Italian Jewish violinist and composer (c. 1570–1630)

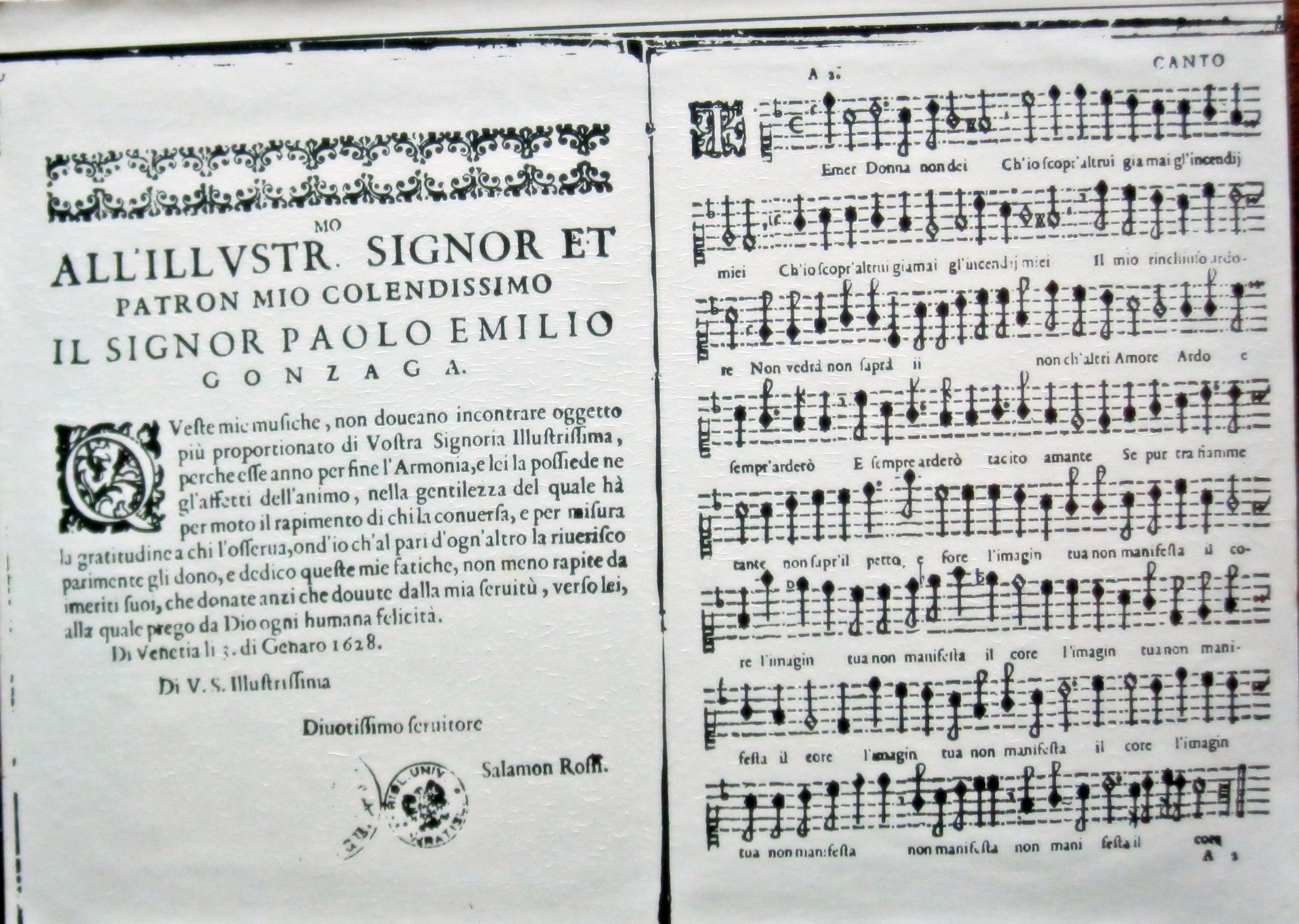
Opening of Rossi's Madrigaletti, Venice, 1628

Salamone Rossi or Salomone Rossi (Hebrew: סלומונה רוסי or שלמה מן האדומים) (Salamon, Schlomo; de' Rossi) (ca. 1570 – 1630) was an Italian Jewish violinist and composer. He was a transitional figure between the late Italian Renaissance period and early Baroque.

== Life ==
Rossi was likely born on 19 August 1570 in Mantua. Some scholars, like E. Werner, claimed that he was the son of the distinguished historian Azariah de’ Rossi; however, Azariah had no sons. Rossi spent his entire professional career in Mantua. As a young man, Rossi acquired a reputation as a talented violinist. He was then hired as a court musician in Mantua in 1587, where records of his activities as a violinist survive in the Gonzaga court.

Rossi served at the court of Mantua for 41 years, from 1587 to 1628 as concertmaster where he entertained the ducal family and their highly esteemed guests. The composers Rossi, Monteverdi, Gastoldi, Wert and Viadana provided fashionable music for banquets, wedding feasts, theatre productions and chapel services amongst others. Rossi was so well-thought of at this court that he was excused from wearing the yellow badge that was required of other Jews in Mantua. He also probably worked with a Jewish theatrical group, playing a significant role in Mantuan theatrical life in the ghetto, the Christian community, and at court. This is supported by Alessandro Pico, Prince of Mirandola, who requested that he, along with his ‘his group of musicians’ be sent to Mirandola to entertain the Duke of Modena.

Rossi was probably not related to any of the other Mantuan musicians with the same surname, such as Mattheo Rossi. The only exception is Rossi's sister, Madama Europa. She was an opera singer, and possibly the first Jewish woman to be professionally engaged in that area. Like her brother, she was employed at the court in Mantua; she is thought to have performed in the intermedio Il Ratto di Europa, by Gabriello Chiabrera and Gastoldi, during the wedding festivities for Francesco Gonzaga in 1608. Europa disappeared after the end of the Gonzaga court and the subsequent sack of the ghetto. Rossi himself died during the War of the Mantuan Succession, probably either during the invasion of Austrian troops, who defeated the Gonzagas and destroyed the Jewish ghetto in Mantua, or in the subsequent episode of plague which ravaged the area.

== Works ==
=== Italian ===
His first published work (released in 1589) was a collection of 19 canzonettes, short, dance-like compositions for a trio of voices with lighthearted, amorous lyrics. Rossi also flourished in his composition of more serious madrigals, combining the poetry of the greatest poets of the day (e.g. Guarini, Marino, Rinaldi, and Celiano) with his melodies. In 1600, in the first two of his five madrigal books, Rossi published the earliest continuo madrigals, an innovation which partially defined the beginning of the Baroque era in music; these particular compositions included tablature for chitarrone.

Rossi published 150 secular works in Italian, including:

Canzonette a 3, Libro primo

- I bei ligustri, for 3 voices
- Correte amanti, for 3 voices
- S'el Leoncorno, for 3 voices

Madrigali a 5, Libro primo

- Cor Mio, madrigal for 5 voices
- Dir mi che più non ardo, madrigal for 5 voices

=== Instrumental ===
In the field of instrumental music, Rossi was a bold innovator. He was one of the first composers to apply to instrumental music the principles of monodic song, in which one melody dominates over secondary accompanying parts. His trio sonatas, among the first in the literature, provided for the development of an idiomatic and virtuoso violin technique. They stand midway between the homogeneous textures of the instrumental canzona of the late Renaissance and the trio sonata of the mature Baroque.

Works published and preserved today include:

- Il primo libro delle sinfonie e gagliarde a 3–5 voci (1607)
- Il secondo libro delle sinfonie e gagliarde a 3–5 voci (1608)
- Il terzo libro de varie sonate, sinfonie (1613)
- Il quarto libro de varie sonate, sinfonie (1622)

=== Hebrew ===
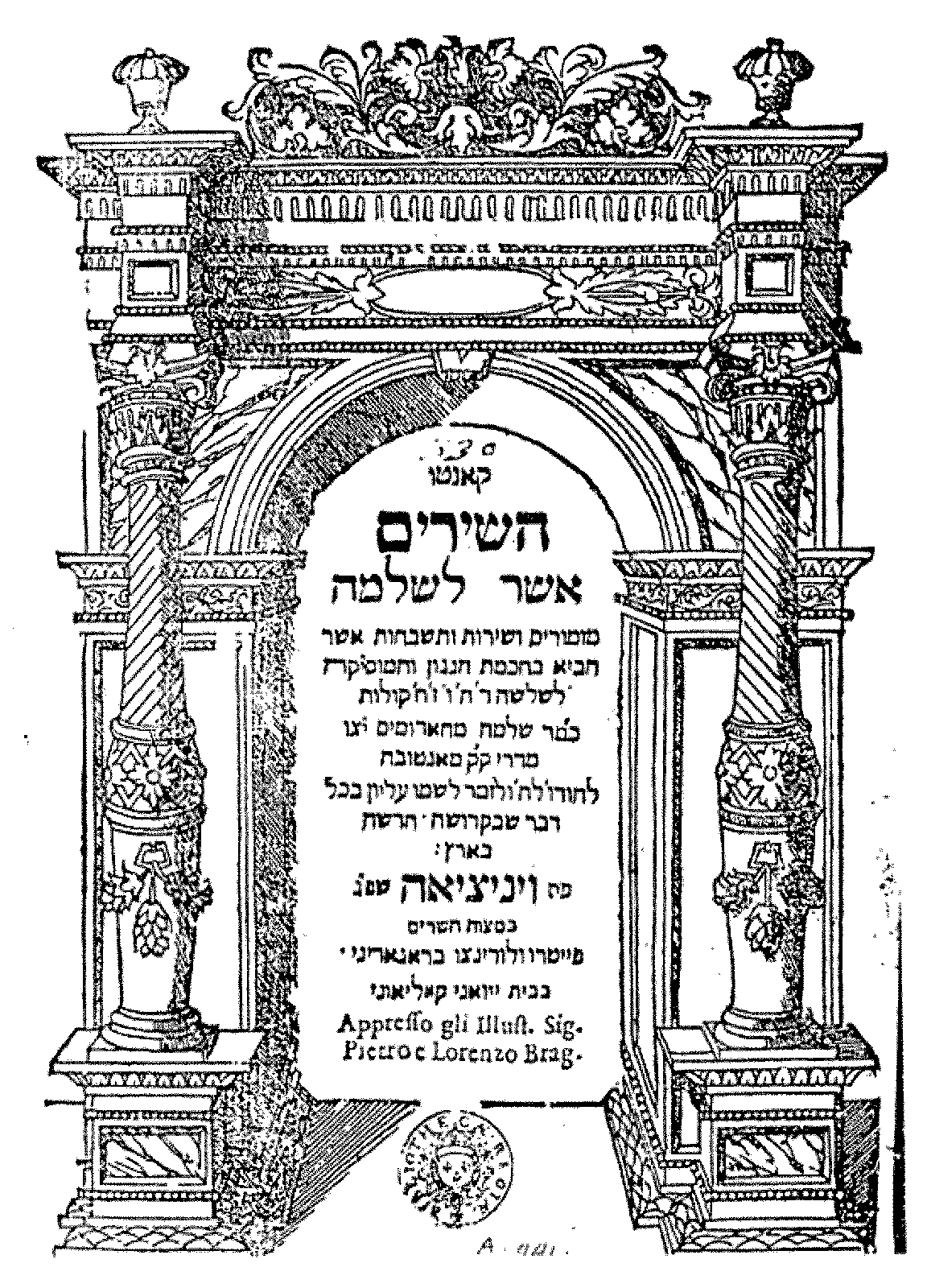
Title page of the first edition of Hashirim asher leSholomo (Venice: Pietro e Lorenzo Bragadino, 1623)

Rossi also published a collection of Jewish liturgical music, השירים אשר לשלמה (Ha-shirim asher li-Shlomo, The Songs of Solomon) in 1623. The biblical Song of Solomon does not appear within The Songs of Solomon, hence the name is probably a pun on Rossi's first name (Rikko 1969).

The collection was written in the Baroque tradition and (almost) entirely unconnected to traditional Jewish cantorial music. Ostensibly intended for use in the synagogue, this was an unprecedented development in synagogal music.

The music was published in Venice, not by one of the specialist music printers who published Rossi's secular work, but by the Bragadin Press. A project of the aristocratic Bragadin family, the press had for decades monopolised the printing of Hebrew books in the republic. Rossi's is the earliest known published collection of liturgical music in Hebrew; there would not be another for two hundred years. The publication begins with an introductory essay by the rabbi and scholar Leon of Modena. It praises Rossi's works and makes a case for the halachic suitability of composed music in Jewish liturgy, based on biblical precedents.

Rossi set many Biblical Hebrew texts to music in their original Hebrew language, which makes him unique among Baroque composers. His vocal music resembles that of Claudio Monteverdi and Luigi Rossi, but its lyrics are in Hebrew.

Milnes Vol. I

  - Adon 'olam (8v) piyyut
    - Recorded by Boston Camerata
  - Barekhu (3v) prayer
    - Recorded by Profeti della Quinta (2009), Boston Camerata
  - Ein keloheinu (8v) piyyut
  - Elohim hashivenu Ps. 80:4, 8, 20
    - Recorded by Profeti della Quinta (2009)
  - Haleluyah. Ashrei ish yare et Adonai (8v) Ps. 112
  - Haleluyah. Haleli nafshi (4v) Ps. 146
  - Haleluyah. Ode Adonai (8v) Ps. 111
  - Hashkivenu (5v) prayer —
    - Recorded by Profeti della Quinta (2009)
  - Keter yitenu lakh (4v) Great kedusha
    - Recorded by Profeti della Quinta (2009)
  - Lamnatseah binginot mizmor shir (3v or 4v) Ps. 67
  - Mizmor le'Asaf. Elohim nitsav (3v) Ps. 82
  - Mizmor leDavid. Havu l'Adonai (6v) Ps. 29
  - Mizmor shir leyom hashabat (8v) Ps. 92
  - Shir hama'a lot. Esa'einai (5v) Ps. 121
  - Yigdal Elohim hai (8v) piyyut
  - Yitgadal veyitkadesh (3v and 5v) Full kaddish
    - Arranged for 5 voices and recorded by Profeti della Quinta (2009)
- Milnes Vol. II
  - 'Al naharot Bavel (4v) Ps. 137
    - Recorded by Profeti della Quinta (2009)
  - Barukh haba beshem Adonai (6v) Ps. 118:26–29
    - Recorded by Boston Camerata
  - Eftah na sefatai (7v) piyyut
  - Eftah shir bisfatai (8v) piyyut
    - Recorded by Boston Camerata
  - Ele mo'adei Adonai (3v) Lev. 23:4
  - Lamnatseah 'al hagitit (5v) Ps. 8
    - Recorded by Profeti della Quinta (2009)
  - Lamnatseah 'al hasheminit (3v) Ps.12
  - Lemi ehpots (8v) Wedding ode
    - Recorded by Profeti della Quinta (2009)
  - Mizmor letoda (5v) Ps. 100
  - Odekha ki'anitani (6v) Ps. 118:21–24
  - Shir hama'a lot. Ashrei kol yere Adonai (3v, 5v and 6v) Ps. 128
  - Shir hama'a lot. Beshuv Adonai (5v) Ps. 126
  - Shir hama'a lot leDavid. Lulei Adonai (6v) Ps. 124
  - Yesusum midbar vetsiya (5v) Isaiah 35:1–2, 5–6, 10

== Recordings ==
- Rossi, S: Il terzo libro de varie sonate, sinfonie, gagliarde, brandi e corrente, Op. 12 Il Ruggiero, Emanuela Marcante Tactus 2012
- Rossi: (1) Vocal Works, (2) Madrigals, (3) Canti di Salomone. 3 CDs licensed from Tactus Records Italy to Brilliant Classics, Netherlands. BLC 93359

Madrigaletti op. XIII - Ensemble L'aura soave. Diego Cantalupi TC.571802 2000
Primo libro di madrigali a 4 voci - Arie a voce sola dal I Libro dei Madrigali a 5 voci - Ut Musica Poësis Ensemble Director: Stefano Bozolo TC.571803 2001
Canti di Salomone a 3 parti - Sonata e Salmi di Henry Purcell - Mottetto di André Campra - Ensemble Hypothesis Director: Leopoldo d'Agostino TC.571804 2003

- The Songs of Solomon. Corvina Consort dir. Zoltan Kalmanovits, Hungaroton 2006
- The Songs of Solomon, Volume 1: Music for the Sabbath. Pro Gloria Musicae PGM 108
- The Songs of Solomon, Volume 2: Holiday and festival music Jewish sacred music from 17th-century Italy by Salamone Rossi, New York Baroque, dir. Eric Milnes. Troy, NY: Dorian, 2001
- The Song of Solomon and Instrumental Music. Profeti della Quinta, Ensemble Muscadin. ℗2008, ©2009. Pan Classics PC 10214. Includes libretto with Hebrew texts
- Rossi: Il mantovano hebreo Profeti della Quinta Vol.2 Elam Rotem Linn 2013
- Salomone Rossi Ebreo: A Jewish Composer in 17th Century Italy Ensemble La Dafne, Stefano Rossi Release Date: 9th Feb 2018 GB5638 Bongiovanni
- Rossi, S: The Two Souls of Solomon Ensemble Daedalus, Roberto Festa Accent
- Salamone Rossi Hebreo Boston Early Music. dir. Prof. Joshua R. Jacobson
- Salomone Rossi - Illumine Our Hearts Sursum Corda. MSR Classics. 2010-02-09

on collections

- Musique judéo-baroque. Boston Camerata, dir. Joel Cohen. LP: ℗1979. CD: Arles: Harmonia mundi, ℗1988. Harmonia mundi France HMA 1901021
- Jewish Baroque Music of Rossi, Lidarti, Caceres. Ensemble Salomone Rossi. Concerto CTO 2009
- 'Salamone Rossi Hebreo Mantovano': Siena Ensemble, directed by Michelene Wandor. Vocal and instrumental music. Classical Recording Company (London) 2002.
- Sacred Bridges.The King's Singers and Sarband. Signum Classics SIGCD065 2005

== Sources ==
- Birnbaum, Eduard (1978) Jewish musicians at the court of the Mantuan dukes, 1542–1628, Tel Aviv : Tel Aviv University, Faculty of Fine Arts, School of Jewish Studies, 1978, c. 1975
- James Haar, Anthony Newcomb, Glenn Watkins, Nigel Fortune, Joseph Kerman, Jerome Roche: "Madrigal", in The New Grove Dictionary of Music and Musicians, ed. Stanley Sadie. 20 vol. London, Macmillan Publishers Ltd., 1980. ISBN 1-56159-174-2
- Harran, Don (2003). Salamone Rossi: Jewish Musician in Late Renaissance Mantua. Oxford University Press. 332 pages. ISBN 0-19-816271-5
- Nettl, Paul and Theodore Baker (1931). "Some Early Jewish Musicians" in The Musical Quarterly, Vol. 17, No. 1. (Jan., 1931), pp. 40–46. ISSN 0027-4631
- Patuzzi, Stefano, Music from a Confined Space: Salomone Rossi's "Ha-shirim asher liShlomoh" (1622/23) and the Mantuan Ghetto, in "Journal of Synagogue Music" (Sacred Space), ed. by Joseph A. Levine, Fall 2012, volume 37, pp. 49–69.
- Patuzzi, Stefano, I Canti di Salomone Rossi e l'"invenzione" della musica ebraica, in Lombardia Judaica, ed. by Giulio Busi and Ermanno Finzi, Florence, Giuntina, 2017, pp. 39–48.
- Rikko, Fritz (1969). "Salamon Rossi, Hashirim Asher L'shlomo (The Songs of Solomon)" in The Musical Quarterly, Vol. 55, No. 2 (Apr., 1969), pp. 269–275
- Jacobson, Joshua R. (2016) "Salamone Rossi Renaissance Man of Jewish Music" Berlin: Hentrich & Hentrich, ISBN 978-3-95565-187-9 (Jüdische Miniaturen Bd. 196)
- Seroussi, Edwin (2004) "On the Footsteps of the 'Great Jewish Composer'": Review-Essay of Don Harrán's Salamone Rossi: Jewish Musician in Late Renaissance Mantua. In Min'ad: Israel Studies in Musicology Online 3.
  - "In the Footsteps of the "Great Jewish Composer"" (PDF). Archived from the original (PDF) on 2 May 2006.
