= Ajyal =

Ajyal may refer to:

- Ajyal TV, a Saudi children's television channel
- Ajyal (TV series), a Lebanese soap opera
- Ajyal (youth movement), a division of HaShomer HaTzair in Israel
