= Givat Haviva International School =

Coordinates: 32°27′27″N 35°1′12″E

- Hebrew: בית הספר הבינלאומי גבעת חביבה
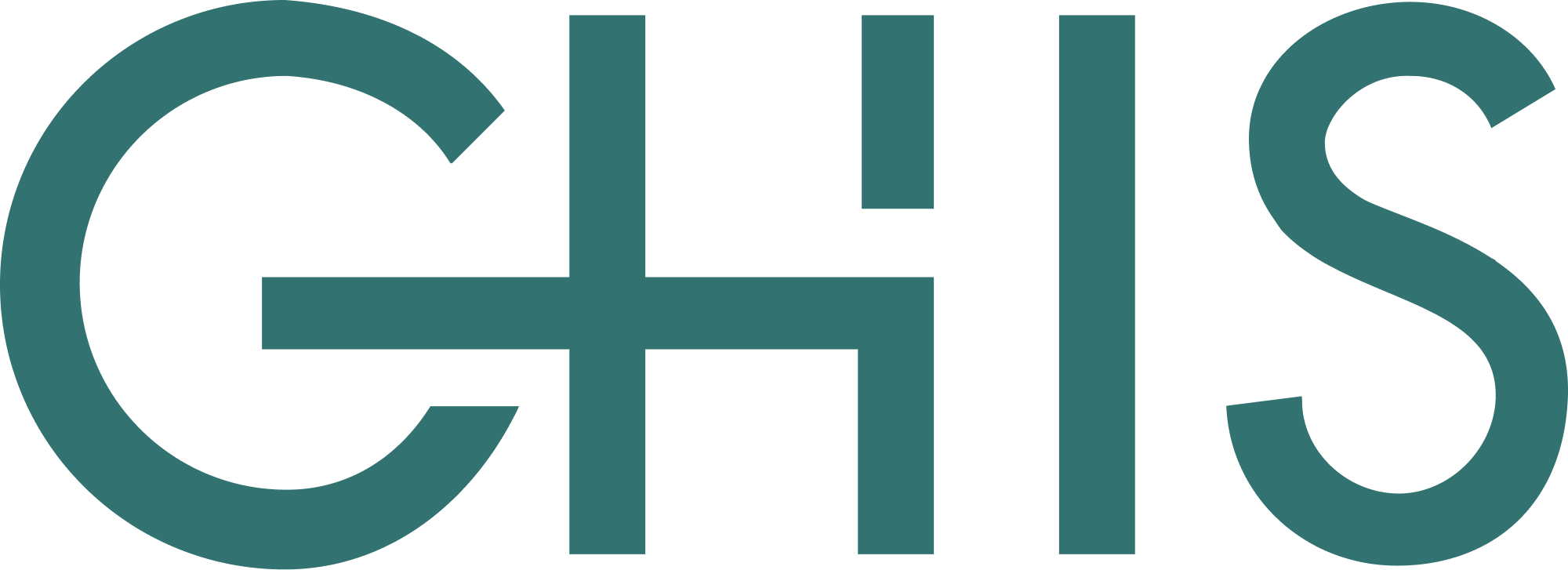
- Givat Haviva; Menashe Regional Council; Haifa District, 3785000; Israel

Information
- School type: State
- Established: August 2018; 7 years ago
- Authorizer: International Baccalaureate
- Director: Nurit Gery
- Head teacher: Yuval Dvir
- Staff: ~40
- Grades: 10 – 12
- Gender: Co-educational
- Enrollment: ~150
- Student to teacher ratio: 4:1
- Website: gh-is.org

Givat Haviva International School (Hebrew: בית הספר הבינלאומי גבעת חביבה), commonly shortened to GHIS, is a co-educational boarding school in Northern Israel. The school follows the International Baccalaureate Diploma Programme (IBDP) for 11th and 12th grade students, and offers a pre-IB preparatory year for 10th graders. GHIS seeks to transform the Middle East and beyond by "developing a network of global leaders who will work together to achieve a shared society and a sustainable, just future". The school is located on the campus of Givat Haviva, a peace-building organization that has received the UNESCO Peace Prize.

== Students ==
The student body at GHIS represents many nationalities, with 25% being Israeli Jews, 25% being Israeli Arabs, and the other 50% being international students.

== Events ==
=== Ministry of Foreign Affairs ===
The student body was invited to attend a meeting with Yuval Rotem, the Director General of the Israeli Ministry of Foreign Affairs and visited the ministry in Jerusalem on 23 January 2019.

=== Austrian state visit ===
On 6 February 2019, Austrian president Alexander van der Bellen visited GHIS as part of a state visit to Israel. Van der Bellen was accompanied by a delegation of journalists and prominent Austrians including his military attaché Thomas Starlinger and Martin Weiss, the Austrian ambassador to Israel.
