= The Abraham Initiatives =

Non-profit organization

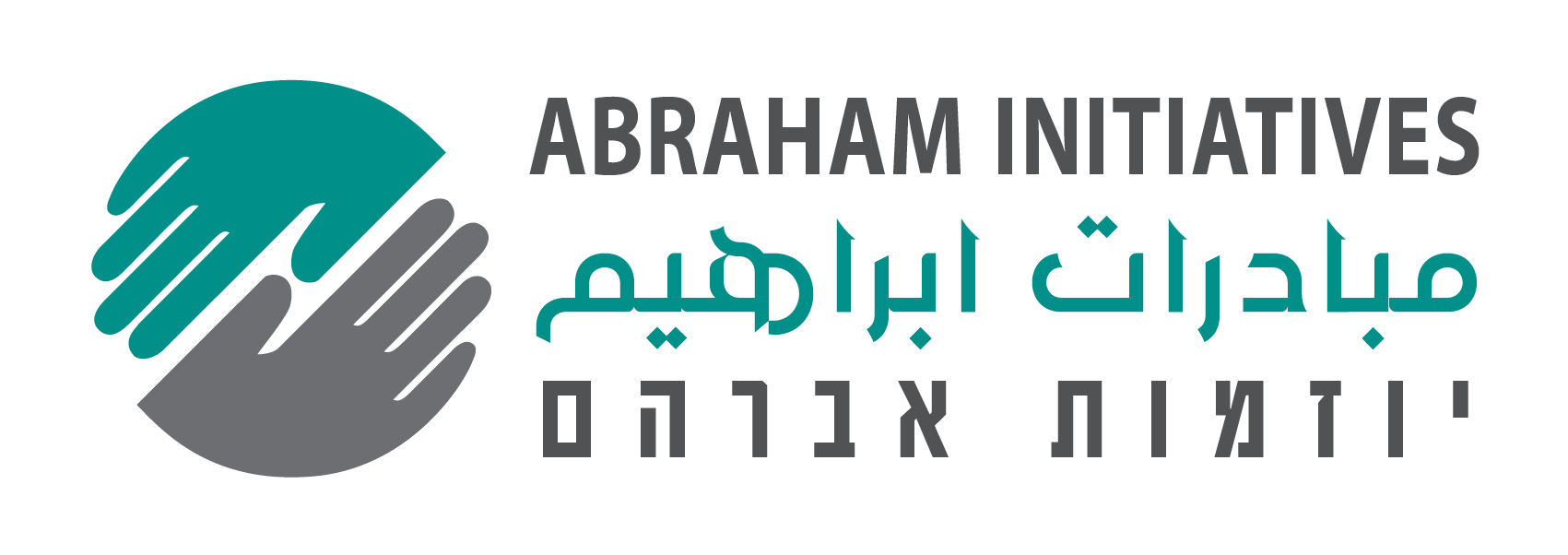

The Abraham Initiatives is a non-profit organization based in Lod (Israel), New York City and London. Named after the common ancestor of both Jews and Arabs, Abraham. According to its website, it "strives to fulfill the promise of full and equal citizenship and complete equality of social and political rights for Israel’s Jewish and Arab citizens".

== History ==
Founded in 1989 by the late Alan B. Slifka and Eugene Weiner, the Abraham Initiatives was one of the first nonprofit organizations dedicated to furthering coexistence between Israel's Arab and Jewish citizens.

Following the October 2000 riots, the organization underwent a strategic turning point. While it originally functioned primarily as a philanthropic foundation that distributed grants, it shifted its operational strategy to "Advocacy Through Action" (Hebrew: שכנוע באמצעות הדגמה). To implement this strategy and design systemic reforms for building a shared society, the organization dispatched approximately 20 delegations to Northern Ireland. This initiative was conducted in collaboration with Prof. Mari Fitzduff, the founding director of the Community Relations Council in Belfast, to study and import successful conflict-resolution models to the Israeli context.

The organization subsequently shifted its focus toward large-scale public policy and economic research. At the January 2008 Herzliya Conference, the organization presented a pioneering study demonstrating that the under-integration of Arab citizens within the national workforce resulted in an annual economic loss of NIS 30 to 40 billion to the Israeli market. This study prompted the Prime Minister's Office to establish a dedicated unit for the economic development of the Arab sector.

== Special campaigns ==
The Abraham Initiatives has implemented a number of stand-alone campaigns aimed at fostering greater tolerance in Israeli society between the Arab and Jewish populations and responding to key issues as they arise. Examples of these include the Yom Kippur-Eid al-Adha Tolerance Campaign. In 2014 and 2015, the major Jewish and Islamic Holy Days of Yom Kippur and Eid al-Adha coincided. This concurrence rarely occurs, approximately every 33 years, and in Israel has the potential to spark unrest as a result of the very different traditions associated with these religious days. Yom Kippur is a somber day of fasting and introspection, and Eid al-Adha is a joyous celebration. Furthermore, in Israel, even though the Jewish population is aware of the timing and basic customs of Ramadan, it is generally unaware of Eid el-Adha and could misinterpret the celebrations as provocations. The Abraham Initiatives worked to raise awareness to this concurrence. This was done through various actions. In 2014 – a large conference which hosted both Chief Rabbis of Israel and major Muslim leaders and a series of newspaper adverts in the Hebrew and Arabic media. In 2015, joining forces with the Israeli collage artist Hanoch Piven, The Abraham Initiatives created a short animated clip which was screened on Israeli TV channels and on social media. The animation was narrated in both Arabic and Hebrew by well-known Israeli celebrities Mira Awad (who also sits on the Board of Directors of the Abraham Initiatives) and Alon Neuman.

According to the Times of Israel after the October 7 massacre, the Abraham Initiatives partnered with Tzedek Centers and Givat Haviva, two other groups promoting shared society among Jews and Arabs, to establish the Guardians of Partnership project in cities where both communities live side by side.

== Present and past leaders of the non-profit organization ==
The organization's staff includes both Jewish and Arab employees working in collaboration. It maintains offices in the United States and the United Kingdom. The international board of directors consists of approximately 30 members and is currently co-chaired by attorney Geoffrey Lewis and Orni Petruschka. The chairman of the UK Friends of the Organization is Neil Hamburger.

Board Chairs

- Alan B. Slifka – Chair of the International Board (1989–2007)
- Howard Sohn – Co-Chair of the International Board (2007–2018)
- Geoffrey Lewis – Co-Chair of the Board (present)
- Orni Petruschka – Co-Chair of the Board (present)

Executive Directors

- Rachel Shilo – Executive Director (1990–2000)
- Dan Patir – Executive Director (2000–2005)
- Mohammad Darawshe – Co-Executive Director (2007–2013)
- Dr. Thabit Abu Rass – Co-Executive Director (2013–2024)
- Amnon Be'eri-Sulitzeanu – Co-Executive Director (present)
- Shahira Shalaby – Co-Executive Director (present)
