= Alan B. Slifka =

American banker (1929–2011)

- Born: Alan Bruce Slifka; October 13, 1929; New York City, US
- Died: February 4, 2011 (aged 81); New York City, US
- Education: Harvard University, M.B.A. Yale University
- Occupations: Securities analyst, investor, philanthropist
- Employer(s): Halcyon Asset Management, founder and co-chairman L.F. Rothschild & Company
- Known for: The Abraham Fund Initiatives; Big Apple Circus; Joseph Slifka Center for Jewish Life at Yale University; Alan B. Slifka Foundation
- Spouses: Jacqueline W. Slifka (div.); Virginia Bayer Slifka (div.); Riva Ariella Ritvo-Slifka (m. 2004)
- Children: 3
- Awards: Knesset Prize for Coexistence, 2000

Alan Bruce Slifka (October 13, 1929 – February 4, 2011) was an American investor and philanthropist, a co-founder of the Abraham Fund, and founding chairman of the Big Apple Circus. He was a native of Manhattan, New York City.

== Education ==
Slifka was born on October 13, 1929, in New York City. His father was Joseph Slifka, who owned textile and real estate businesses, was a developer of apartment buildings, and died in 1992. Slifka and his twin sister Barbara were initially home schooled by their mother, Sylvia. This provided an opportunity for the twins to learn the importance of moral values and the basics of coexistence. In the fourth grade, the twins began studying at the Ethical Culture Society's Fieldston School.

Slifka graduated from Yale University in 1951, where he worked on the business staff of campus humor magazine the Yale Record. He then went on to earn a Master's degree in Business Administration at Harvard University in 1953.

== Professional background ==
Following his graduation from Harvard, Slifka joined the financial firm L.F. Rothschild & Company, where he worked as a securities analyst for 32 years, rising to partner before leaving to start his own company, an investment firm that is now Halcyon Asset Management.

== Philanthropy ==
In 1977, Slifka became the founding chairman of the New York School for Circus Arts, a non-profit training school whose performing arm is the Big Apple Circus. In 1993, he became founding chairman emeritus. In 1995, in recognition of Slifka's lead gift to a successful capital campaign, the circus's new permanent creative center in Walden, NY was named the Slifka Family Creative Center.

Together with sociologist Eugene Wiener, Slifka was a co-founder in 1989 of The Abraham Fund Initiatives, named for the common ancestor of Arabs and Jews, and served as chairman of the organization since its founding. This was the first nonprofit organization dedicated to furthering coexistence between Israel's Arab and Jewish citizens. The Abraham Fund works to advance a shared society of inclusion and equality between Jews and Arabs in Israel.

The Slifka Program on Intercommunal Coexistence at Brandeis University, create by Slifka in 2001, seeks to build professional expertise and creative leadership in the field of coexistence and offers a master's degree in coexistence and conflict. The Sylvia and Joseph Slifka Israeli Coexistence Scholarship at Brandeis, which Slifka funded in honor of his parents, is awarded each year to two citizens of Israel (one Jewish, one Arab) who are committed to fostering coexistence and harmony.

In recognition of his work with The Abraham Fund Initiatives, Slifka was awarded the Knesset Prize for Coexistence in 2000. Brandeis awarded him an honorary doctorate in 2003.

== Alan B. Slifka Foundation ==
The Alan B. Slifka Foundation was established in New York in 1965. The foundation's goals include harmony not only among Jews and Arabs but also between religious and secular elements of Israeli society. In addition to fostering Jewish values and education, the foundation also promotes biomedical research on sarcomas and autism spectrum disorders.

== Personal life ==
Alan Bruce Slifka was the son of Joseph and Sylvia Slifka. His twin sister is Barbara Slifka. His father owned successful textile and real estate businesses.

At the time of his death on February 4, 2011, aged 81, from cancer, he was married to Riva Ariella Ritvo-Slifka. His prior two marriages, to Jacqueline W. Slifka and Virginia Bayer Slifka, ended in divorce. He had three sons.

Alan and his twin sister Barbara took control of 24-story office building 477 Madison Avenue in Manhattan after their father, Joseph Slifka, left it to them following his 1992 death. Alan's two sons, Randy Slifka and Michael, later became involved in a tangled struggle for the property with their father's sister. In 2017, they claimed that their elderly aunt had orchestrated a power grab against their interests, and they sued their aunt Barbara; that case was thrown out. After Alan's death, his son Randy Slifka sued in March 2023 seeking $37 million in connection with the sale; that case was also dismissed. Randy Slifka then sued law firm Paul, Weiss, Rifkind, Wharton & Garrison in June 2023, alleging that when it advised Randy's aunt Barbara on the sale of the building the firm cost him and his brother their rightful share of the $258 million paid for the building. A Paul Weiss spokesman, speaking of the more recent suit, said "Mr. Slifka is a serial litigator who filed a nearly identical claim that was summarily dismissed last month in the same court. This lawsuit is equally frivolous ..."
