= Hashomer Hatzair =

Labor Zionist youth organization

Hashomer Hatzair השומר הצעיר
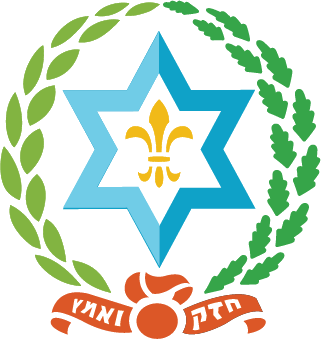
- Hashomer Hatzair emblem
- Formation: 1913; 113 years ago
- Type: Labor Zionism, Socialism; Jewish Youth Movement
- Purpose: Educational
- Region served: Worldwide
- Members: Youth
- General Secretary (Heb. Mazkir Klali): Oren Zukiercorn
- Affiliations: Mapam (1948-1997); Kibbutz Artzi federation (1927—1999); IFM – SEI
- Website: www.hashomer-hatzair.org

Hashomer Hatzair (Hebrew: הַשׁוֹמֵר הַצָעִיר, lit. 'The Young Guard', IPA: [haʃoˈmeʁ hatsaˈʔiʁ]) is a Labor Zionist, secular Jewish youth movement founded in 1913 in the Kingdom of Galicia and Lodomeria, Austria-Hungary. It was also the name of the Hashomer Hatzair Workers Party, the group's political party in the Yishuv in Mandatory Palestine.

Hashomer Hatzair, along with HaNoar HaOved VeHaLomed of Israel, is a member of the International Falcon Movement – Socialist Educational International.

== Early formation ==
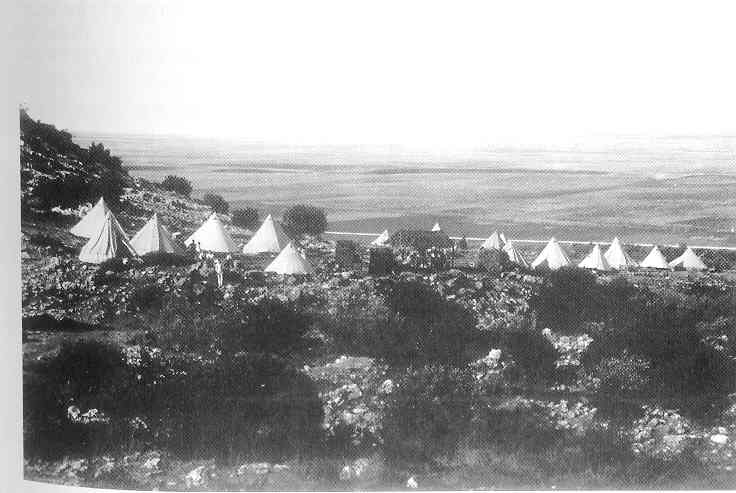
Pioneer's camp of Gdud Shomeria, 1920, Mandatory Palestine

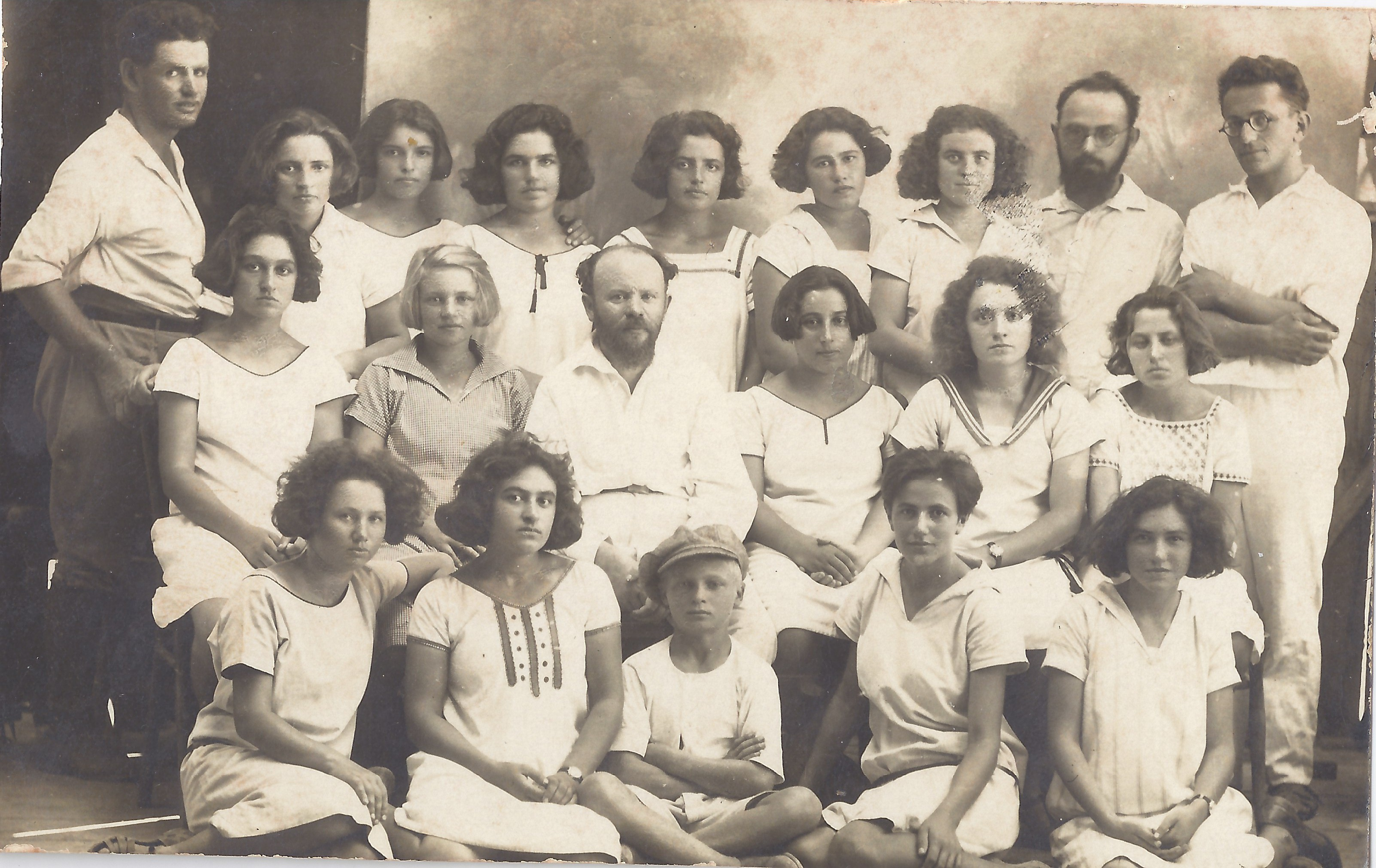
Kfar Yeladim principal Shneur Zalman Pugachov sitting among a group of girl students (probably graduates) and teachers Zvi Zohar, Arieh Allweil and Dov Yoffe (~ 1926-1931)

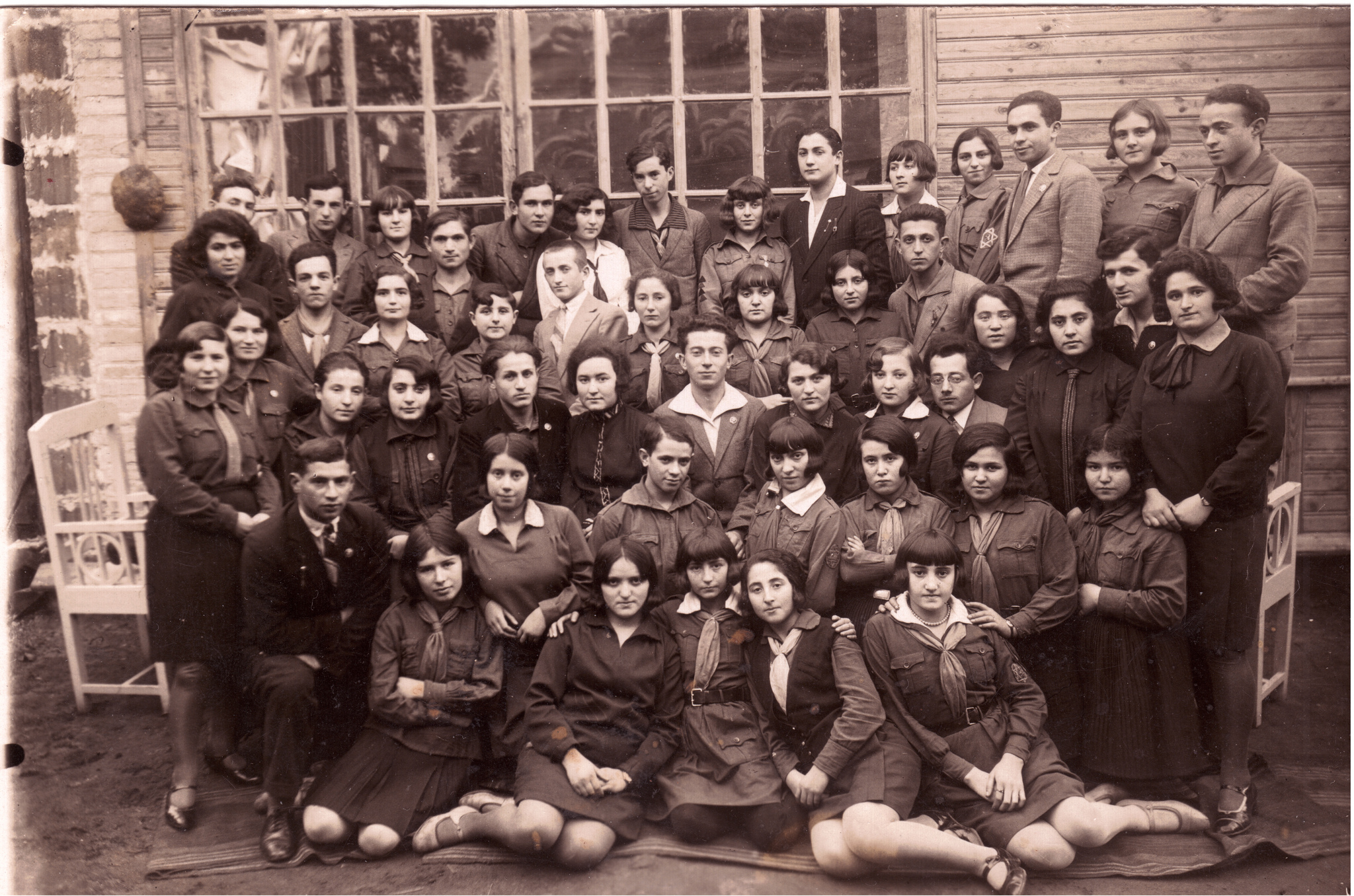
Hashomer Hatzair youth group of the city Slonim in Poland, 1934

Hashomer Hatzair came into being in the Polish province of Galicia, then part of the Habsburg Empire, in 1913 as a result of the merger of two groups, Hashomer ('The Guard'), a Zionist scouting group, and Ze'irei Zion ('The Youth of Zion'), which was an ideological circle that studied Zionism, socialism and Jewish history. The two groups originally united under the name "Hashomer", possibly taking inspiration from the Jewish defense organization also named Hashomer, established in Palestine in 1909, which had become a symbol of pioneering spirit and political aspirations for the younger generation of Jewish nationalists in eastern Europe and elsewhere; the group would take up the name "Hashomer Hatzair" around 1919.

Hashomer Hatzair is the oldest Zionist youth movement still in existence. Initially Marxist-Zionist, the movement was influenced by the ideas of Ber Borochov and Gustav Wyneken as well as Baden-Powell and the German Wandervogel movement. Hashomer Hatzair believed that the liberation of Jewish youth could be accomplished by aliyah (immigration; literally "ascent") to Palestine and living in kibbutzim. After the First World War the movement spread to Jewish communities throughout the world as a scouting movement.

Psychoanalysis was also an influence, partly through Siegfried Bernfeld; so was the philosopher Martin Buber. Otto Fenichel also supported Hashomer Hatzair's efforts to integrate Marxism with psychoanalysis. Hashomer Hatzair's educators sought to shape the image of the child from birth to maturity; some were aware of the work of the Soviet educator Anton Makarenko, who also propounded collectivist education.

Members of the movement settled in Mandatory Palestine as early as 1919. In 1927, the four kibbutzim founded by Hashomer Hatzair banded together to form the Kibbutz Artzi federation. The movement also formed a political party that shared the name Hashomer Hatzair, advocating a binational solution in mandatory Palestine with equality between Arabs and Jews. That is why, when a small group of Zionist leaders met in New York in May 1942 in the Biltmore Hotel, Hashomer Hatzair representatives voted against the so-called Biltmore Program.

In 1936, the kibbutz-based Hashomer Hatzair party launched an urban political party, the Socialist League of Palestine, which would represent non-kibbutzniks who shared the political approach of the members of Hashomer Hatzair kibbutzim and the youth movement in the political organizations of the Yishuv (as the Jewish community in Palestine was known). The Socialist League was the only Zionist political party within the Yishuv to accept Arab members as equals, support Arab rights, and call for a binational state in Palestine. In the 1930s, Hashomer Hatzair (along with Mapai) was affiliated with the centrist Marxist "Two-and-a-half" International, the International Revolutionary Marxist Centre (also known as the "London Bureau") rather than either the more mainstream socialist Labour and Socialist International or the Leninist Third International.

== Growth and the Holocaust ==
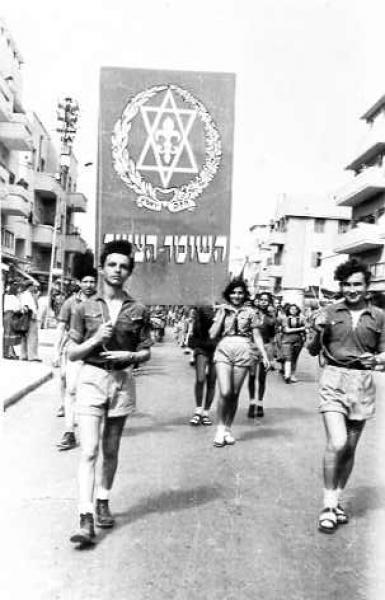
Hashomer Hatzair's 1 May parade in Haifa in the 1950s

By 1939, Hashomer Hatzair had 70,000 members worldwide. The movement's membership base was in Eastern Europe. With the advent of World War II and the Holocaust, members of Hashomer Hatzair focused their attention on resistance against the Nazis. Mordechai Anielewicz, the leader of Hashomer Hatzair's Warsaw (JCO) branch, became head of the Jewish Combat Organization and one of the leaders of the Warsaw Ghetto Uprising. Due to ideological differences JCO declined to fight together with the Betar fighting group. Other members of the movement were involved in Jewish resistance and rescue in Hungary, Lithuania and Slovakia. The leaders of Hashomer Hatzair in Romania were arrested and executed for antifascist activities. A personal account of the Holocaust, In the Mouth of the Wolf details the escape of Hashomer Hatzair member Rose Zar (née Ruszka Guterman) from the Piotrków Ghetto and hiding in plain sight, by working for the Wehrmacht and the SS.

The former head of Hashomer Hatzair in Łódź, Abraham Gancwajch, on the other hand, formed the Jewish Nazi collaboration network Group 13 (also known as the Jewish Gestapo) in December 1940, active in the Warsaw Ghetto. He was also the leader of the infamous Gestapo-sponsored, Nazi-collaborationist Jewish organisation Żagiew, which was formed in February 1943 at the beginning of the Warsaw Ghetto Uprising.

After the war, the movement was involved in organizing illegal immigration of Jewish refugees to Palestine. Members were also involved in the Haganah military movement as well as in the leadership of the Palmach.

After World War II, the movement was largely Stalinist into the 1950s and in 1953 cancelled its Purim festivities due to Stalin's death. Support for Stalin and the Soviet Union began to wane in 1952 as a result of the Slánský trials which targeted Jewish leaders in the Communist Party of Czechoslovakia in a series of show trials, and also resulted in the arrest, torture and four-and-a-half year imprisonment of Mapam official Mordechai Oren while he was visiting the country to intervene in support of two local Hashomer Hatzair members who had been arrested and falsely accused.

Members of Hashomer Hatzair in Kfar Saba branch blowing the trumpet as they wave the movement´s flag, 1941

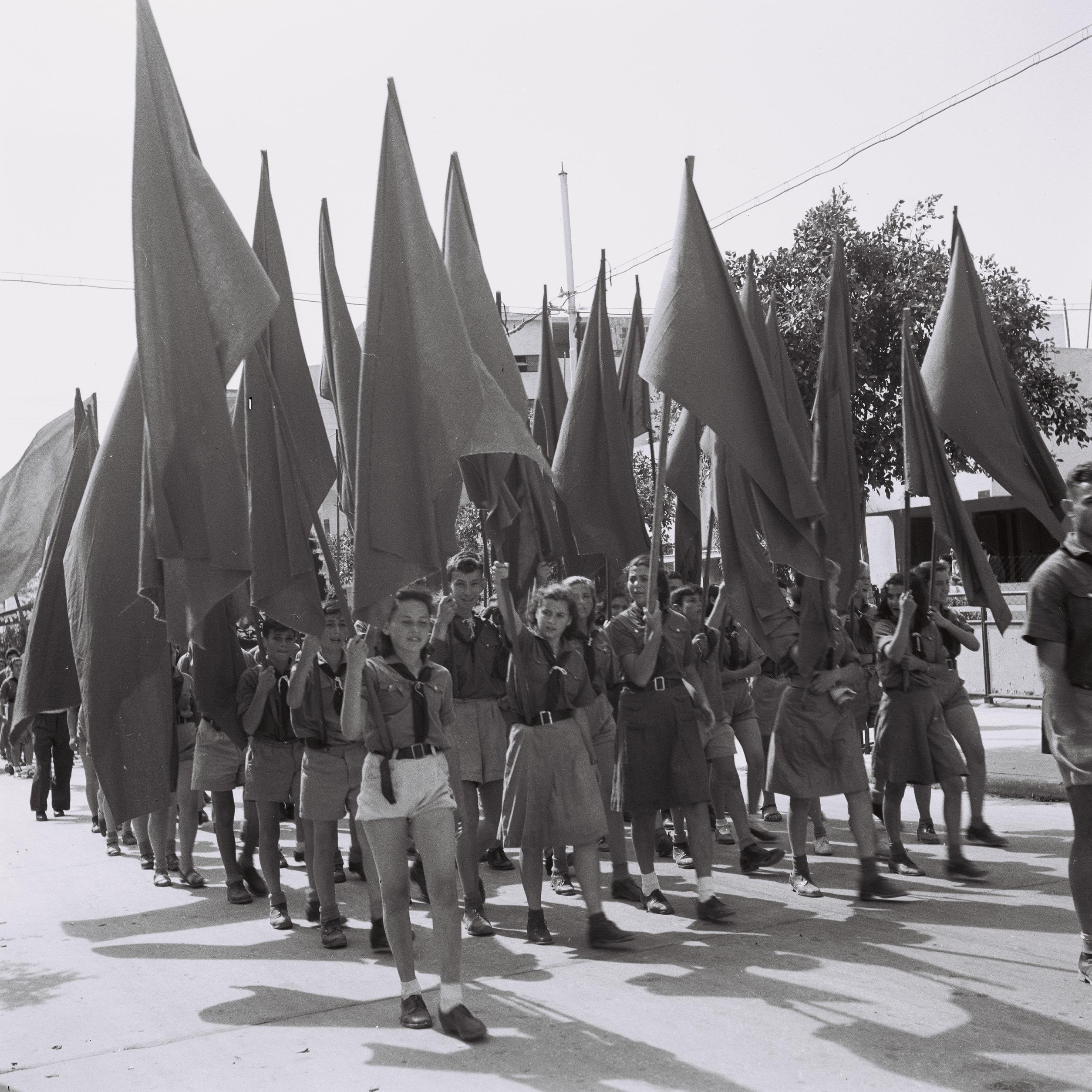
Members of the Hashomer Hatzair youth movement march in the May Day parade in Tel Aviv, 1946

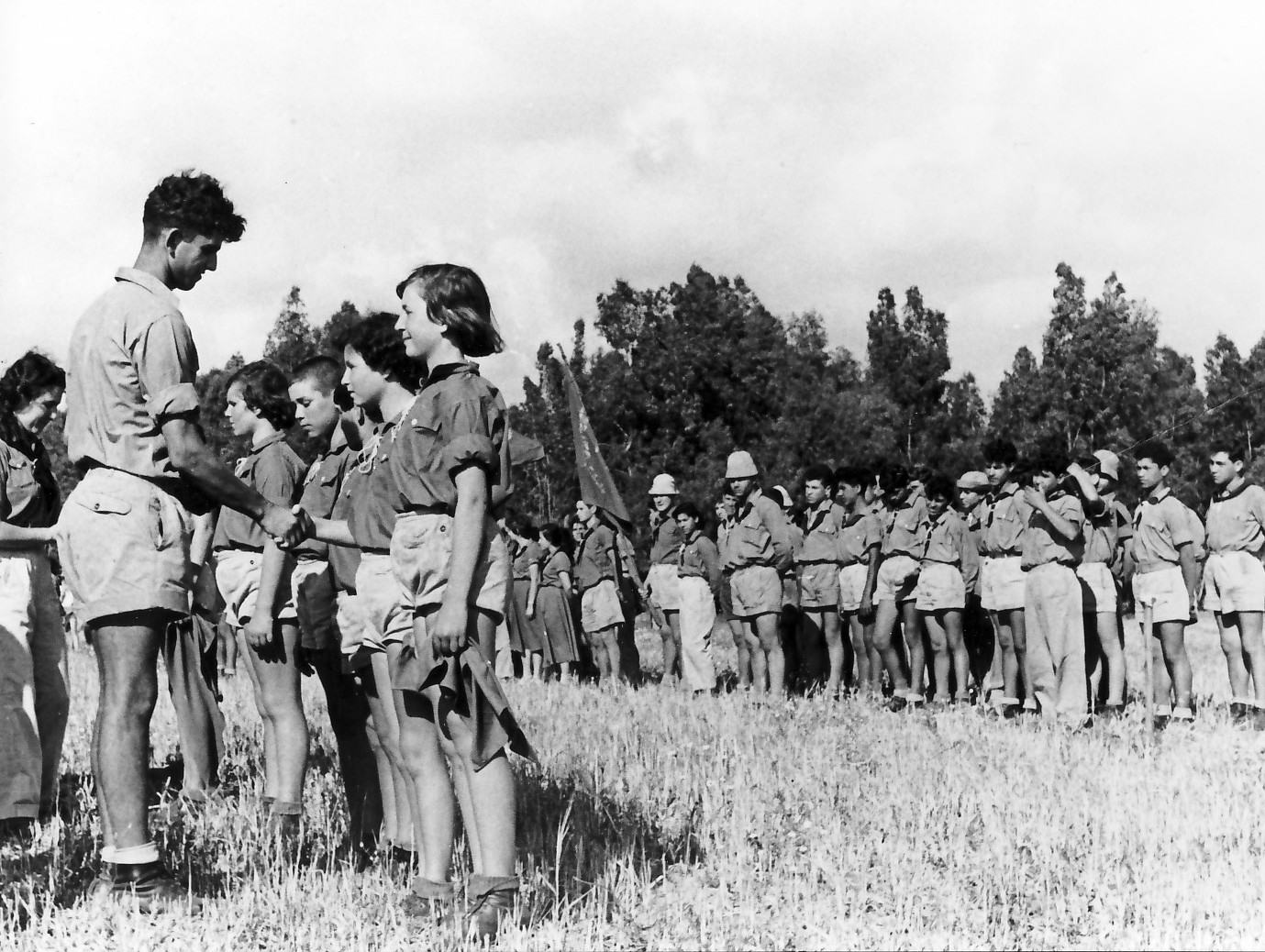
Members of the Hashomer Hatzair in Gan Shmuel kibbutz, circa 1955

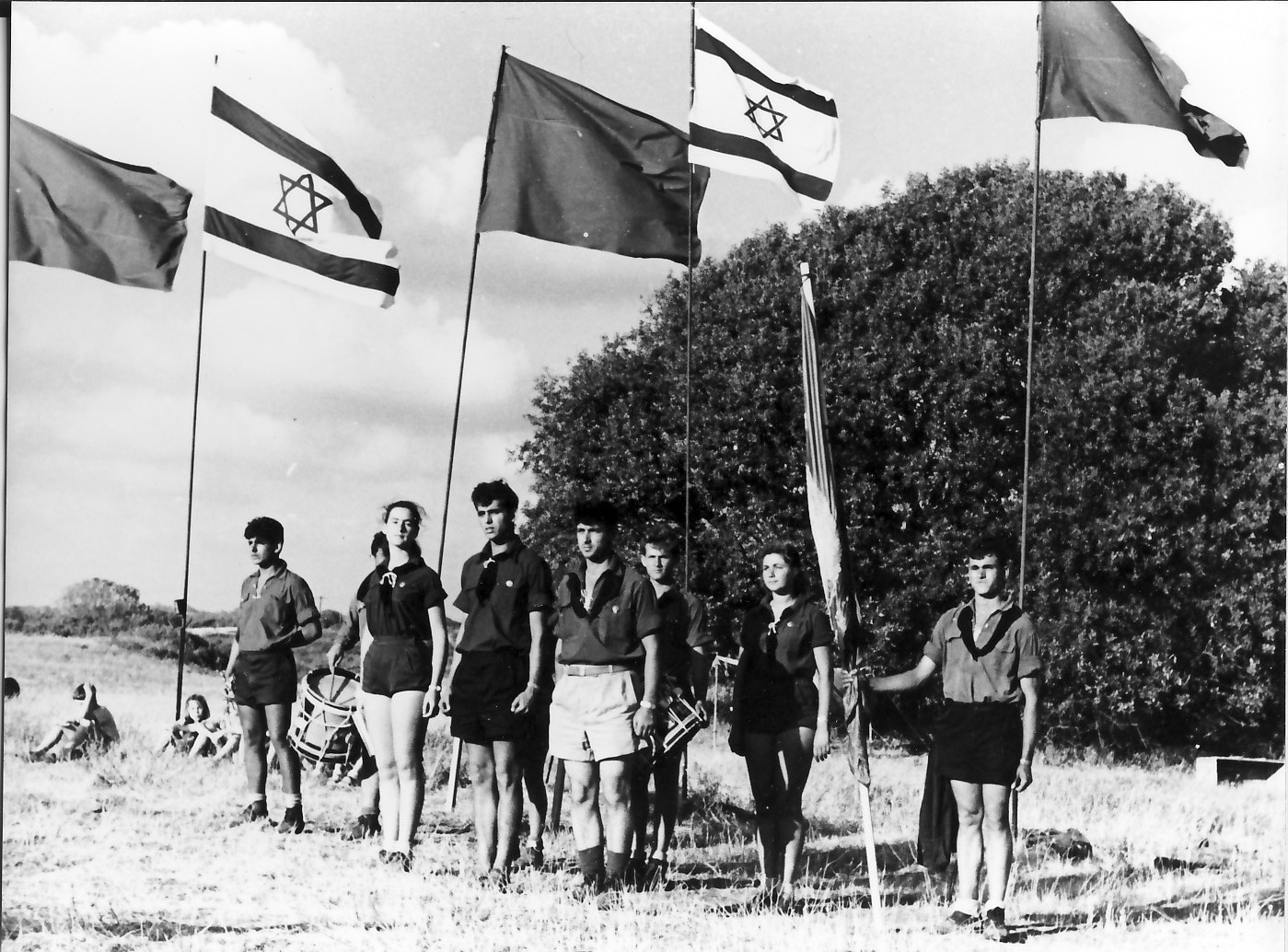
Gan Shmuel, circa 1957

== Present ==
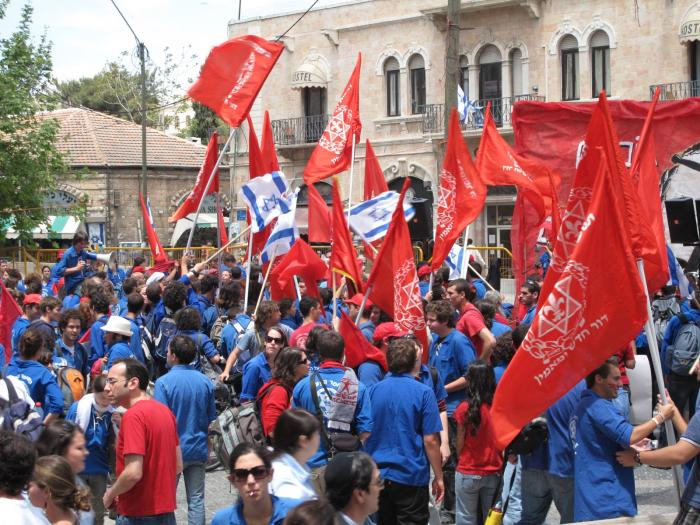
1 May parade in Jerusalem 2009

Hashomer Hatzair continues as a youth movement based in Israel, and operates internationally. In Europe, North and Latin America, as well as in Australia, Hashomer Hatzair organizes activities and camps (machanot) for the youth. Activities are still ideological, but over time have been adapted to the needs of modern communities, vastly different from the context in which Hashomer Hatzair was created.

The movement has more than 7,000 members worldwide (excluding Israel) running weekly youth activities and camps in Germany, Canada, the United States, Mexico, Venezuela, Brazil, Argentina, Uruguay, Chile, France, Belgium. Austria, Italy, Switzerland, Netherlands, Hungary, Bulgaria, Belarus, Ukraine, Australia and Poland.

Famous alumni include Evelyn Torton Beck, Arik Einstein, Dan Shechtman, Bella Abzug, Tony Cliff, Ehud Gazit, Ernest Mandel, Mordecai Anielewicz, Abraham Leon, Martin Monath, Benny Morris, Eliane Karp, Leopold Trepper, Amnon Linn, Zahara Rubin, Haviva Reik, Aaron Klug, Abba Hushi, Sam Spiegel, Irv Weinstein, Manès Sperber, Leon Rosselson, Juliana Rozestan, José Gurvich, Ilan Goldfajn, Joel Westheimer, Avi Levacov, Prisoner X (Ben Zygier), Milo Adler Gilles, Gila Martow, and even Isser Harel and Menachem Begin who were briefly members before joining Mapai and the right wing Betar respectively, as well as Kerem B'Yavneh's Rabbi Avraham Rivlin. Noam Chomsky sympathized with and worked with the group, although he was never a member.

While the United Kibbutz Movement and Kibbutz Artzi, Hashomer Hatzair and UKM's youth movement, Habonim Dror, have remained separate, although they have increasingly co-operated in various countries where they co-exist. However, the views of each movement on religion may be an obstacle to merger as Habonim Dror has a stronger identification with cultural Judaism as opposed to Hashomer Hatzair, which has been at times stridently secular and anti-religious — seeing itself as a leader of a legitimate expression of a secular stream of Judaism.

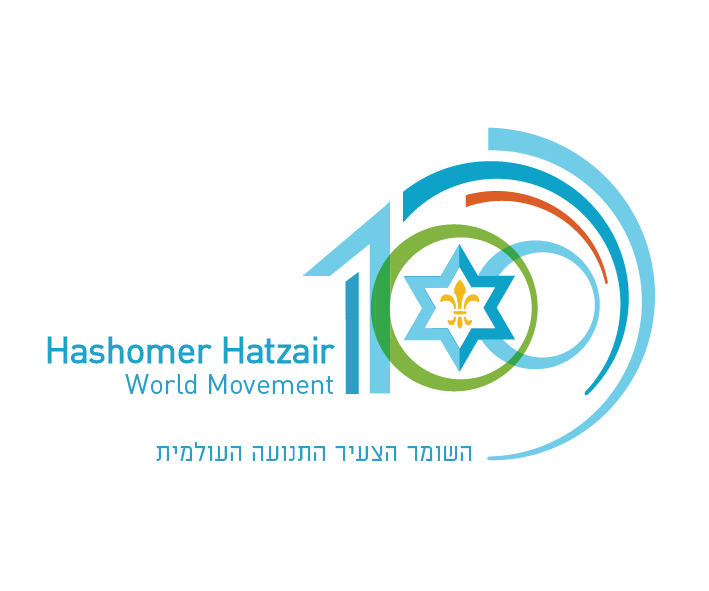
This is the logo of the 100th anniversary of Hashomer Hatzair (2013).

The old tnua Semel (Hashomer Hatzair) until 2013

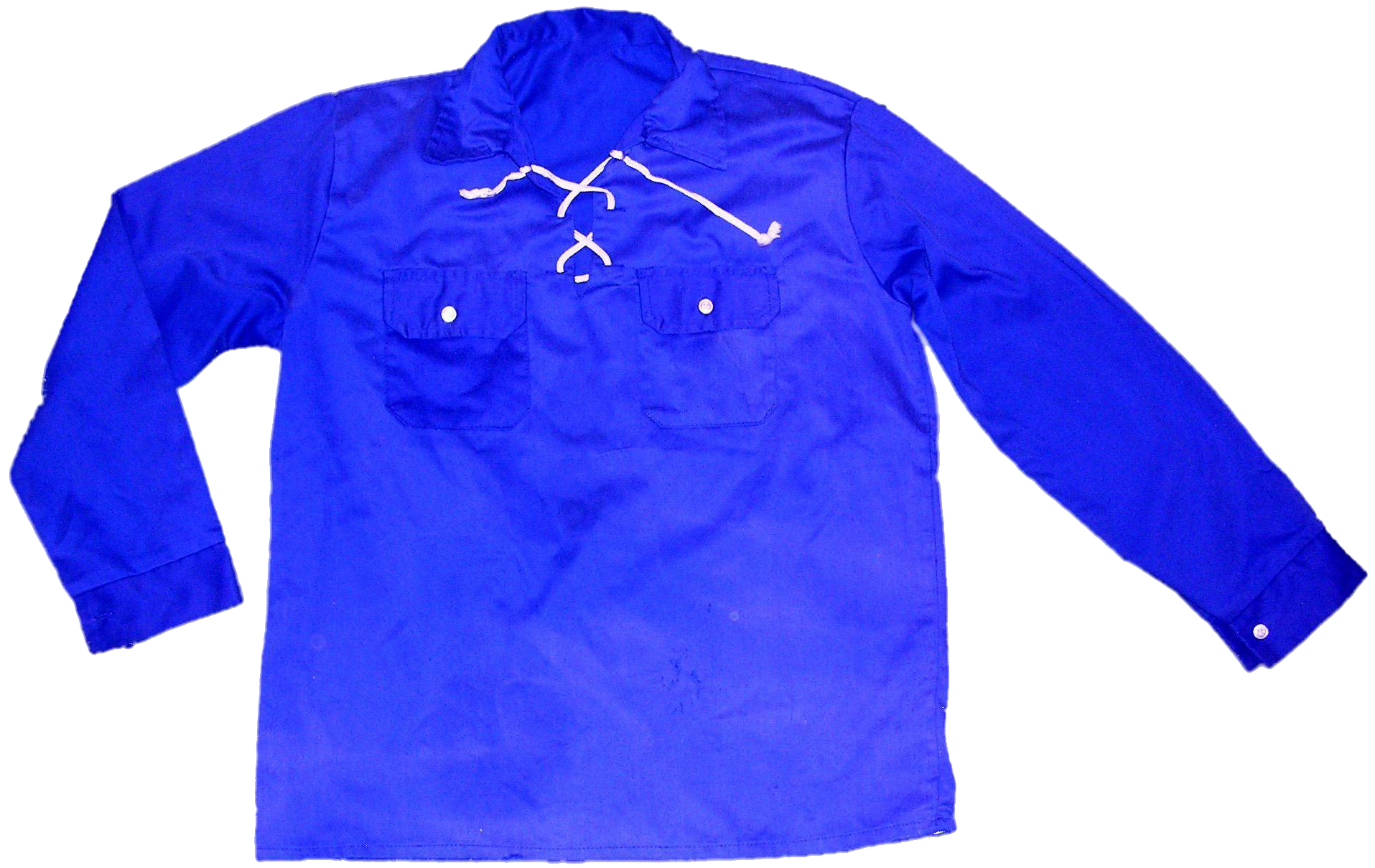
The shirt of Hashomer Hatzair

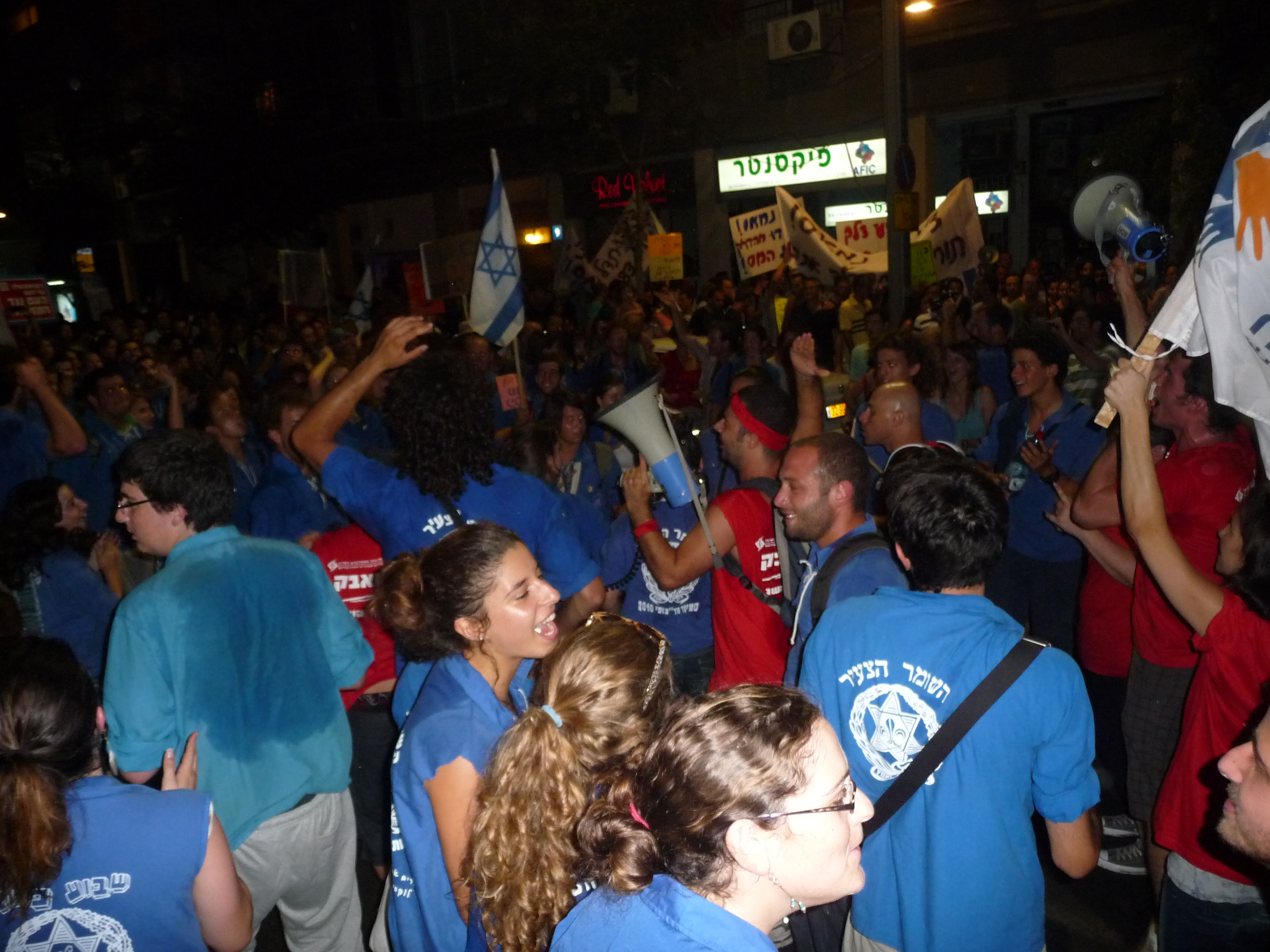
Hashomer Hatzair at a demonstration against the housing prices in Israel 2011

=== Argentina ===
Once a huge movement inside the large Argentinian Jewish Community, Hashomer Hatzair Argentina suffered from decay common to all Zionist youth movements in Argentina during the last decades, as well as several military dictatorships in the country's history that directly or indirectly led to the closure of several of its kenim. The movement operates in Tzavta Centro Comunitario (Tzavta Community Center), in the neighborhood of Almagro, City of Buenos Aires. It is one of 9 Zionist Youth Movements in the city. It has around 120 members, running regular Saturday activities and secular Kabalat Shabat service, besides two machanot per year.

=== Australia ===
The movement in Australia is located in Melbourne and was established in 1953 as a break away from Habonim Dror. There was briefly a ken (branch) in Sydney during the 1960s, but it closed due to a lack of members. Many of the original bogrim (leaders) of Australian Hashomer Hatzair settled in kibbutz Nirim. Its building in Melbourne is known as Beit Anielewicz, located in the suburb of St Kilda East. It runs weekly meetings as well as bi-annual camps which take place in the Australian countryside, during the summer and winter months. Hashomer Hatzair Australia is a member of the Australasian Zionist Youth Council (AZYC).

Currently, there are around 70 members of 'Hashy' Australia in Melbourne. Meetings for chanichim/ot (participants) from school years 3-12 are on Sunday afternoons and evenings. During Year 10 (age: 15–16) chanichim/ot undergo a 'hadracha' (leadership) course. This course is run by current bogrim/ot in the movement and teaches the chanichim/ot leadership skills which are used when they lead members of the Junior movement in Year 11. The current Year 11 madatzim/ot (leaders) are from the kvutzat (group) Negba.

All other 'Hashy' Australia members are situated in Byron Bay, where Madrachim/ot travel 3 times annually.

Hashomer Hatzair Australia has a strong belief that chanichim/ot should be active in the community, helping whenever they can. Members often go to rallies, actively pursue social justice locally and abroad, and run programs for disadvantaged children.

As with most of the kenim around the world, every year Hashy sends the chanichim/ot who have just completed school on a 10-month Shnat program in Israel. Hashy is an active part of the Hashomer Hatzair World Movement and regularly interacts with other kenim as well as other movements.

=== Austria ===
The Austrian Hashomer Hatzair traces its roots to the original Hashomer Hatzair founded in the Galicia region of the Austro-Hungarian Empire. The Hashomer were among the earliest members of the Österreichischer Pfadfinderbund in 1914. They also founded the first ken. It holds around a hundred members, and meets weekly. The ken usually has five active kvutzots and one Bogrim kvutza. The ken has two machanot each year in the winter and summer and a couple of tijulim, every second year the oldest kvutzot the bogrim and the oldest kvutza go to machane Israel in which they attend the Seminar Tzofi or Tzofinodet.

=== Belgium ===
In Belgium, Hashomer Hatzaïr was established in 1920. Each Saturday 250 hanihim take part in folk dancing (rekudei'am), ludic activities (peoulot), and Shabbat celebrations (oneg shabbat). Four camps are organized throughout the year. The November, Winter, and Easter camps usually take place in the Netherlands, and the Summer camp in France. The shaliah is Matan and the shirfa madrihim is composed of the kvutzot of Narshonim (2005) and Mizrah (2006). Until 2006 there was a ken in Liege, but it closed because it was too small. Hashomer Hatzaïr in Belgium is part of the Brith which is composed of the five Zionist youth groups of Belgium: Hashomer Hatzair, Hanoar Hatzioni, Habonim Dror, Bnei Hakiva and Jeunesse Juive Laïque.

=== Brazil ===
In Brazil, the movement is informally called "Shomer" and has six branches: Rio de Janeiro (2), São Paulo, Florianópolis, Brasília, and Natal. Normally, the activities encompass weekly meetings as well as two summer camps (machané) per year. Besides Haflagot, Acantonamentos, Machane de Lag Baomer. In Rio, where the tnuah is bigger, it embodies one of the left-wing Zionist institutions in the local Jewish community, playing a leading role in subjects like the peace process in the Middle East. The educational activities are also aimed at the challenges of Brazilian society, such as social and environmental issues. There are about 300 members in the national movement

=== Bulgaria ===
In Bulgaria, Hashomer Hatzair has been active for more than 20 years and has a branch in Sofia. Тhe Bulgarian branch of Hashomer Hatzair was established after WWII but it closed down when the communist regime in Bulgaria began. The Bulgarian branch was reestablished in 1992 and it has been active ever since. Currently, members are ages 11–20. Meetings for chanichim*ot (the peulots) are on Saturday mornings. Also, there are two camps organized every year - one during the winter and one scouting camp during the summer.

=== US and Canada ===
In the United States and Canada camps last through the school summer vacation. The two summer camps in Liberty, New York, USA and Perth, Ontario, Canada are both called Camp Shomria or "Mosh". In addition, the movement runs activities in cities across the continent throughout the year promoting the Israeli–Palestinian peace process, socialist-Zionism, Hagshama Atzmit (self-actualization), social activism (tikkun olam), and withdrawal from the West Bank and Gaza.

Through seminars, camps (winter/summer), worldwide programs, and weekly activities wherein youth lead youth, Hashomer Hatzair aims to create a just world through socialism, equality, and the betterment of Israel and the world.

There are currently kenim in Toronto, northern New Jersey (Tenafly), central New Jersey (East Brunswick), New York City, Washington D.C., and Philadelphia. The United States is currently in the process of recreating kenim in Westchester, NY and Albany, NY.

Hashomer Hatzair has collaborated with Habonim Dror and other left-wing Zionist groups to form the Union of Progressive Zionists campus network.

In October 2011, Hashomer Hatzair participated in Occupy Toronto and built a sukkah at the site of the protest.

=== Chile ===
The Chilean branch of Hashomer Hatzair was founded more than 60 years ago and it continues educating young Jewish Chileans with the values of social justice, fraternity, Judaism and love for Israel. Currently there are 50–100 members aged 9–22 who meet every Saturday in the Ken located in Santiago. These are young chaverim that self organize and most of them do not belong to any Jewish collectivity or entity, thus most of them will have no link to anything Jewish if it wasn't for the tnua. For further info, visit the up-to-date website in Spanish.

=== France ===
In France, the youth movement spells Hachomer Hatzaïr with a "c". It was founded in Paris in Belleville area, in 1933, by Jews from Poland and Tunisia. The French branch now has about 500 members in two kenim, in Paris and Lyon. The khanikhim (children) (literally, "students") and Bogrim (organizers) (literally, "adults") meet weekly in groups and run 3 makhanot ("Resorts & Leisure") (literally, "camps") in November (or late October), around the end of December, and for 3 weeks in July. The French movement has 3 branches: An educational branch, a political arm, and an "emsheh" branch.

=== Germany ===
Hashomer Hatzair Germany (German: Hashomer Hatzair Deutschland, HHD) is the youth movement in Germany, that operates Ken Berlin (the activity center). It is legally a non-profit, registered association in Germany. It was re-established in 2012 for the first time since it was prohibited during the Second World War and the Holocaust. In the past, the movement was active in several cities in Germany until 1938.

The movement organises weekly activities in Berlin for children and youth ages 8–21, led by the Ken Team, as well as an annual summer camp (Sommermachane). The activity year starts annually in September, around Rosh Hashana.

In 2021, Hashomer Hatzair Germany took part in the #2021JLID – Jüdisches Leben in Deutschland line of events and activities, to celebrate 1,700 years since the first evidence of Jewish lives in Germany and Europe. Following a Pessach Seminar in March 2021, a booklet on Jewish Lives in Germany by HHD and its sub-project ROSBOT was published in July 2021, and was dedicated to Esther Bejarano, Holocaust survivor, artist and activist, who died on the day of the official publication. The summer camp and booklet event were both reported in an article by Micha Brumlik as part of a book on the history of the Jewish youth movements in Germany, which describes the renewal process of the youth movement in Germany. The book was published in its second edition with the support of Berliner Landeszentrale für politische Bildung in 2022, and was also made available digitally.

HHD is currently in the process of growth, through intergenerational projects and initiatives aimed at educators and activists. It offers subsidised activities to its members, allowing participants with less means to take part.

In 2022, on its 10th anniversary of re-establishing the work in Germany, HHD was leading an intergenerational historical project to connect and commemorate the present generation to its generation in the 30s. As part of the project a team of volunteers was established, travelled to Israel to work around materials in the Kibbutzim archives and the Yad Yaari Research & Documentation Center, as well as meeting the former members and their families. The project outcome are "Chaverschaft - the Hashomer Hatzair Card Game" and a board game that is still being developed. For its work around the history of the youth association in Germany, Hashomer Hatzair Deutschland e.V. won the Shimon-Peres-Prize in 2023, given by the German foreign minister, for outstanding initiatives of successful cooperation between young people from Germany and Israel.

=== Hungary ===
Hashomer Hatzair has been re-established in 1989 in Budapest. It is one of the largest Zionist youth movements in Hungary. HH Hungary organizes two camps every year and also offers various programs for Jewish youngsters: bringing charity to Hungarian Holocaust Survivors, cleaning out Jewish cemeteries in the countryside etc. Hashomer Hatzair has approximately 50 members nowadays in Budapest. Hashomer Hatzair was the first Jewish youth movement to be re-established in Hungary after the fall of Communism (1989).

=== Israel ===
The movement has around 80 kenim all over Israel. A Knesset report in 2010 stated that there were around 7,000 official members, making Hashomer Hatzair the fifth largest youth movement in Israel by members. The main actions of the movement are regular activities for youth ages 9–18, education for the tnua values and social actions.

Every year the movement has a conference for the whole "Gub" (Guf Boger, the guides of each ken, ages 15–18) to discuss a yearly topic related to Israeli society, the kenim, and the movement in general. At the end of the conference the members formulate the results of the discussions and chart the future of the movement. Examples of past topics include Zionism and peace, equality between genders, socialism, Judaism in Hashomer Hatzair, and so forth.

After the 1948 Arab-Israeli War, the Hashomer Hatzair Workers Party merged with other left wing parties to form Mapam, a socialist party, which became the political party of both the youth movement and the Kibbutz Artzi federation. In Israel it was traditionally aligned with Mapam and later Meretz; however, it was not officially aligned with Meretz. After the merger of the Meretz-aligned Kibbutz Artzi Federation with the Labor Party's United Kibbutz Movement in 1999, Hashomer Hatzair did not officially align with either party, though by tradition, it was close in outlook to Meretz.

=== Italy ===
Hashomer Hatzair operates four kenim (branches) in Italy—in Rome, Milan, Florence, and Turin. Local members organize two camps per year. The Italian movement can count on about 400 members.

=== Mexico ===
The Mexican branch of Hashomer Hatzair was established in 1940. Since 1983, its "ken" (Hebrew for "nest", i.e., its headquarters), named after Mordechai Anielewicz, is currently located in the Polanco neighbourhood, western part of Mexico City.

Hashomer Hatzair Mexico was founded by Avner Aliphas, a Hebrew professor at the Yiddish school of Mexico and later founder of the "Tarbut" Jewish day school in 1942. Aliphas was born in Kolno, Poland, in 1911, and made aliyah (immigrated to Eretz Israel) in 1936 to join Kibbutz Negba, and in 1938 he helped establish Kibbutz Hanita. In 1939 he returned to Kolno after his mother died and luckily got out before the Nazi invasion to attend a Zionist conference in Paris. When the war broke out and he could not go back to Israel, he traveled to Mexico where he became active in the Zionist movement.

In 1940, supported by the Zionist Organization in Mexico, Aliphas founded Hashomer Hatzair in Mexico, thus giving an option for young people who had been educated towards Zionism at home. This was the first Jewish youth movement that existed in the country; its first Ken was in Tacuba 15, in the city center.

During the next decades, Hashomer Hatzair was one of the places for secular socialization for the Jewish community. As of the present day, the Mexican branch of Hashomer Hatzair comprises approximately fifty members who regularly attend cultural, educational and sporting events as a group.

=== Uruguay ===
Hashomer Hatzair has existed in Uruguay since 1946. In its early stages, there were two different kinim but now there is only one in the centre of the city, consisting of two kvutzot of younger children (ages 6 to 7 and 8 to 10) and another two of older kids (11 to 13 and 14 to 16). The ken is called Ken Mordejai Anilevich and is in the capital city of Montevideo in the neightboard of Pocitos.

=== Netherlands ===
Hashomer Hatzair is active in the Netherlands from the 1950s. Until somewhere in the 1970s there were kenim in Rotterdam and Amsterdam. A ken in Maastricht has been active since around the year 2000. The ken has two kvutzot of older and younger kids (9-12 and 5-8). Ken Maastricht has been part of the World Movement since 2011.

=== Switzerland ===
In Switzerland, Ken Yitzhak Rabin in Zürich consists of some 100 hanihim, meeting on Shabbat afternoon and for two or three camps (annually in autumn and winter, bi-annually in summer), next to the Bogrim's bi-annual trips to Israel or Poland. Special events are held for Pessach, Chanuka and the Yitzhak Rabin memorial. The Ken was founded in 1935 and joined World Hashomer in 1938. During the 2nd world war, there were five major Kenim (Zurich, Basel, Berne, Biel, Geneva) plus activities in a few smaller cities and in the refugee centers. Swiss Shomer members having made aliya can be encountered e.g. in Lehavot Habashan and Magen. As of 2009 the Shomer was the largest Jewish youth movement in Switzerland.

=== Venezuela ===
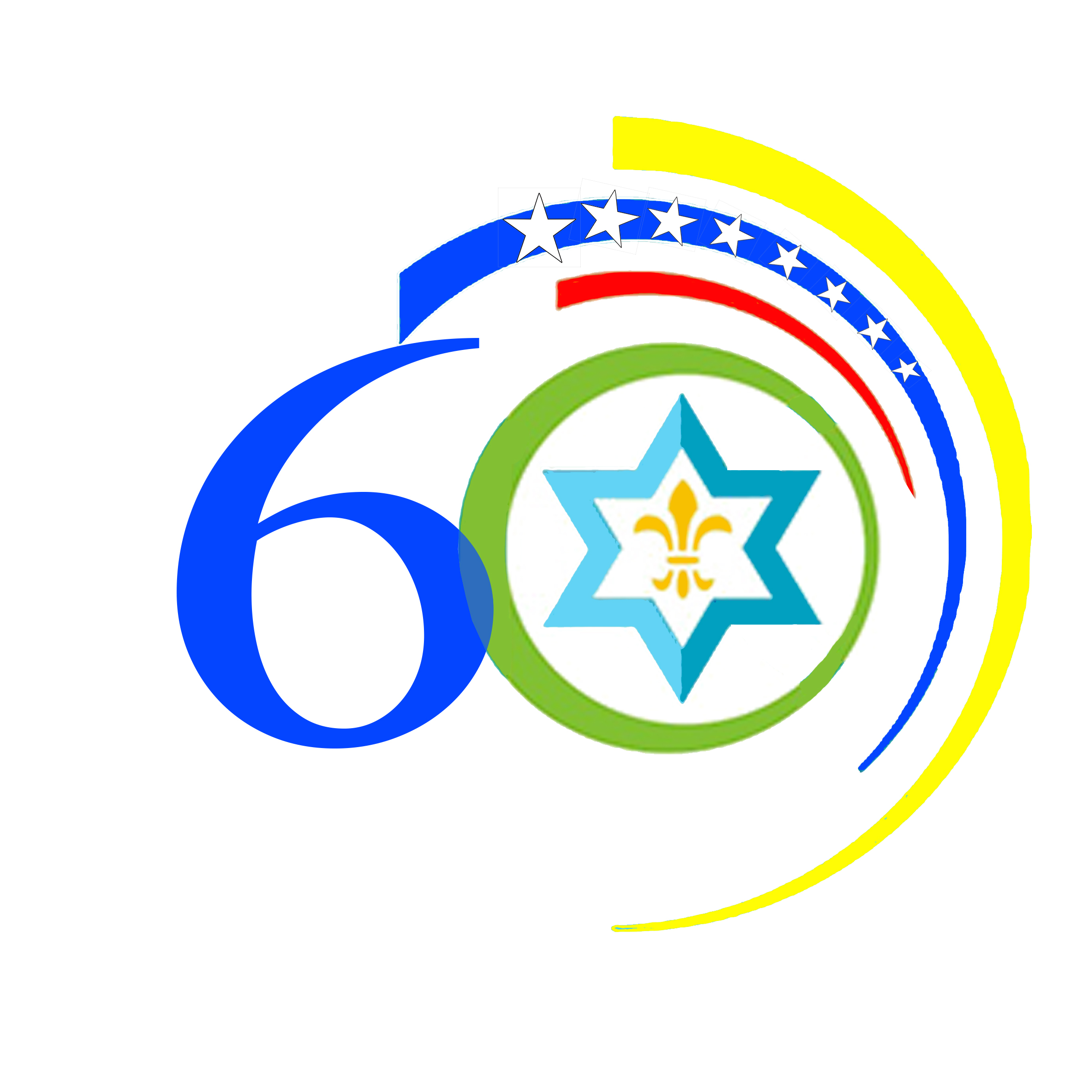
Logo de los 60 años del Ken Najshon, fundado en 1955 por Tamar Campo

Hashomer Hatzair in Venezuela was founded in 1954 in Caracas, coming through Tamar Campo, an immigrant girl from Cuba, who began doing educational activities in September 1954 for young Jews of Venezuela, during the Rosh Hashana festivities. The name is Ken Najshon, inspired like the prince of the tribe of Judah, who led the Jewish people out of Egypt across the waters opened by Moses.

The Ken Najshon the young of the Jewish community of Venezuela, every Saturday at the Hebraica club by peulot where they teach about Zionism, socialism and humanistic Judaism and are taught values of equality, social justice and brotherhood through non-formal education.

== Life Movement (Tnuat Bogrim / Kidmah / Kidma / Kidmat Anilewicz) ==
Around the world, Hashomer Hatzair members have founded a life movement to pick up where the youth movement leaves off. Groups have been organized in Israel by Israelis and non-Israelis, and others were formed in their countries of origin (such as in Canada, the United States, Switzerland and Hungary).

=== Canada and the United States ===
The Life Movement in the United States and Canada has created three urban communes, one in New York and two in Toronto where members are experimenting with the Israeli model of communot in their home societies. In addition, a new winter trip to Israel for Bogrim called Mifgash takes place yearly.

== See also ==
- Ajyal (Arab Division of HaShomer HaTzair)
- Hashomer - a Jewish defense organization in Palestine founded in April 1909
- Kibbutz Artzi - federation of kibbutzim founded by Hashomer Hatzair
- Habonim Dror - Labor Zionist youth movement
- Zionist youth movement
- Poale Zion - early Marxist-Zionist political party
- Secular Zionism
- Tzedek Centers - an Israeli nonprofit organization founded by Hashomer Hatzair Life Movement (Tnuat HaBogrim)
