= Givat Haviva =

National education center of the Kibbutz Federation

Coordinates: 32.4579°N 35.0210°E

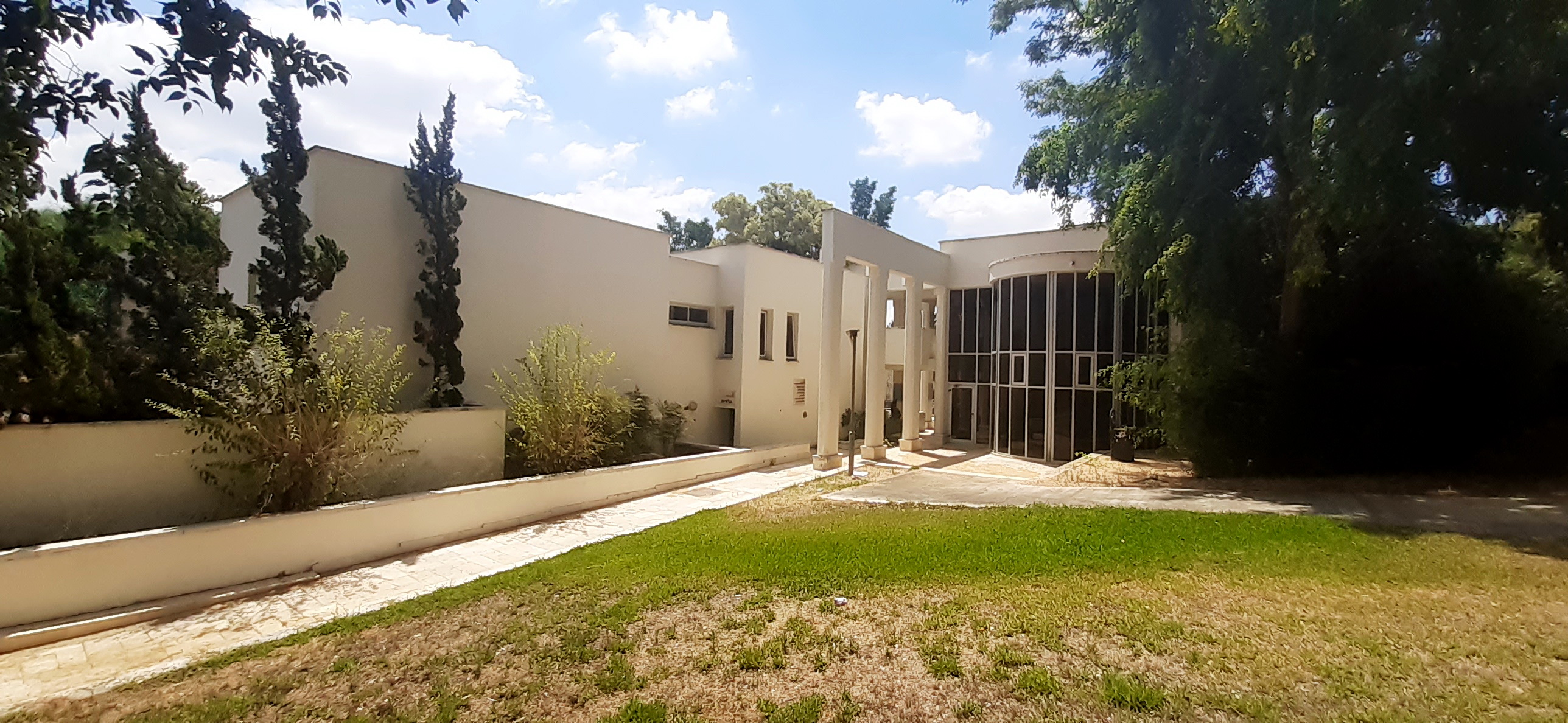
Givat Haviva heritage center

Givat Haviva (Hebrew: גבעת חביבה) is the national education center of the Kibbutz Federation in Israel founded in 1949. It is the oldest institution in Israel promoting reconciliation between Jews and Arabs.

== History ==
Givat Haviva, established in 1949, is the national education, archival, and research center of the Kibbutz Artzi Federation. Givat Haviva was awarded the UNESCO Prize for Peace Education for its longstanding work in promoting Jewish-Arab dialogue and reconciliation. The center is named for Haviva Reik, an activist in the Hashomer Hatzair movement, who made aliyah in 1939. She was one of 32 Jewish parachutists from the Palestinian Mandate who volunteered to join the British Special Operations Executive and infiltrate German-occupied Europe to work with local Jewish communities. She was sent to Slovakia as an emissary of the Haganah on a mission to aid Jews during the Slovak national uprising. Reik and other paratroopers were captured by the Germans occupying Czechoslovakia, and executed. She was 30 years old at the time she was killed.

The Center for a Shared Society aims to build an inclusive, socially cohesive society in Israel by engaging divided communities in collective action towards the advancement of a sustainable, thriving Israeli democracy based on mutual responsibility, civic equality and a shared vision of the future.

The Center holds an annual conference to discuss key issues, share experiences and shape mechanisms for joint action.

The center's North American programs are administered by the Givat Haviva Educational Foundation, which has offices in New York City. As of 2012 it had about $1 million in assets and spent about $400,000 annually on educational programs.

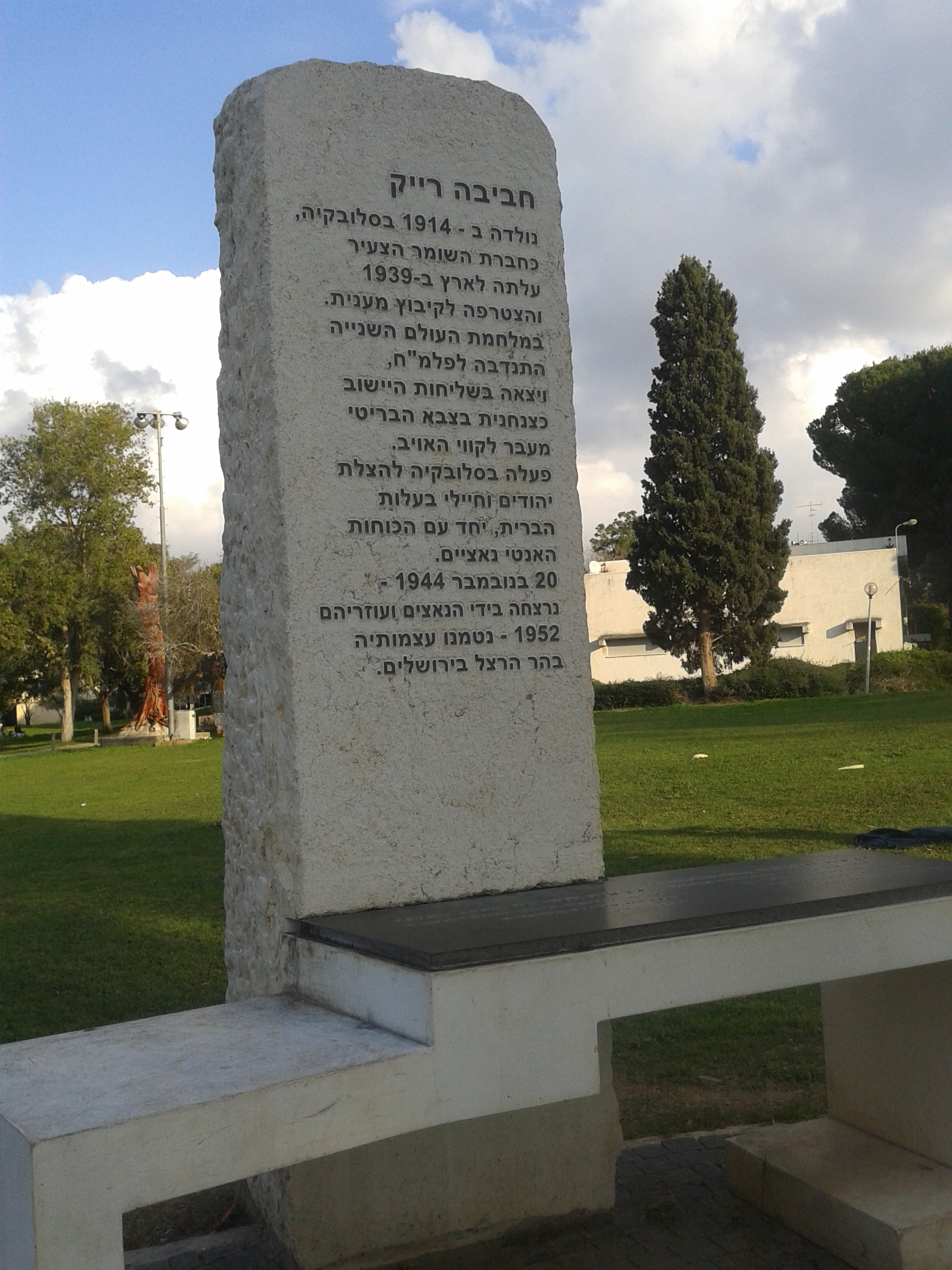
Haviva Reik commemoration monument

== Programs and partnerships ==
The Center for a Shared Society builds mutually beneficial cooperation between pairs of neighboring Jewish and Arab towns. Municipal leadership and citizens work across the divide to facilitate joint initiatives responding to common needs, goals and interests. The goal is the creation of inter-community frameworks that facilitate joint initiatives. Communities are linked through bilateral pairs as well as multi-lateral regional clusters to advance peaceful economic and social development on a national scale.

Givat Haviva established a partnership between the Jewish town of Pardes Hanna-Karkur (population – 32,000) and the neighboring Arab village of Kafr Kara (population – 17,000). Based on the success of this pilot, Givat Haviva established a partnership between the predominately Jewish Menashe Regional Council (population - 13,300) and neighboring Arab city of Baqa al-Gharbiyye (population - 25,875) in 2013. The partnership between the Arab Local Council of Maale Iron (5 villages) and Megiddo Regional Council (13 communities) celebrated a year of joint activity in November, 2015. The fourth and newest partnership is underway between the Arab Local Council of Zemer (4 villages) and the Jewish Regional Council of Emek Hefer (17 communities). Situated in the Wadi Ara region, these communities were strategically chosen due to the proposals of land swaps in this area in the context of the Israeli-Palestinian peace process. It is expected that these pairs will advance the program to embody a cluster of communities in a key demographic area.

The Center runs teacher training programs that draw on modern conflict resolution models and theories to encourage critical thinking and understanding. The Givat Haviva Education Department, part of the Jewish-Arab Center for Peace at Givat Haviva, organizes educational activities that promote equality, mutual recognition, partnership and other elements necessary for the development of a shared society.

As part of its regional strategy, the Education Department focuses on the geographical area in which Givat Haviva is situated informed by the notion that cooperation in dealing with regional challenges can help develop another layer of identity not connected to national identity. As such, regional strategies can foster new attitudes and perceptions regarding the "other" and a feeling of a shared destiny when it comes to the specific regional space inhabited by both Jews and Arabs. Work is conducted in partnership with mayors, municipal education department heads, school principals, administrators and teachers in the region.

The Education Department works in partnership with other organizations to advocate for support with the Ministry of Education in holding conferences and implementing nationwide programs for youth and teacher training activities.

The Center runs programs for the benefit of Arab citizens in Israel that enhance Hebrew language skills of Arab students, advance the status of Arab women, contribute to economic development in Arab towns and villages, and provide civic awareness training for leaders in Arab communities.

The center offers Arab and Jewish populations cross-cultural experiences that foster mutual understanding through language, arts, film and tours. In addition, a variety of experiential learning programs are offered for overseas visitors, including seminars, study tours, Arab language study program for English speakers and conflict resolution & mediation studies.

According to the Times of Israel after the October 7 massacre, the Abraham Initiatives partnered with Tzedek Centers and Givat Haviva established the Guardians of Partnership project in cities where both Arab and Jewish communities live side by side.

== Awards and recognition ==
In 2001, Givat Haviva received the UNESCO Prize for Peace Education for its longstanding work in promoting Jewish-Arab dialogue and reconciliation.

In 2016, the Austrian government awarded the 2016 Intercultural Achievement Award in the Innovation Category to Givat Haviva's program: “Educators for a Shared Society”. That same year, Givat Haviva was awarded the 2016 Dr. Chaim Constantiner Prize in Jewish Education by Tel Aviv University.

== See also ==
- Givat Haviva International School
- HaKfar HaYarok
- Hand in Hand: Center for Jewish Arab Education in Israel
- Neve Shalom
- Education in Israel
