= Tzedek Centers =

Israeli NGO

Tzedek Centers מרכזים לצדק חברתי المركز للعدالة الاجتماعية
- Founded: 2016; 10 years ago
- Type: Non-profit; NGO
- Headquarters: Binyamina, Ha-Takhana St 46
- Region served: Israel
- Key people: Lev Litman, CEO; Izhar Carmon, Founder, Chairperson
- Affiliations: HaShomer HaTzair
- Website: merkazim.org

Tzedek Centers (Social Justice Centers; Hebrew: מרכזים לצדק חברתי, Merkazim L'Tzedek Hevrati; Arabic: المركز للعدالة الاجتماعية, Almarkaz Lileadalat Alaijtimaeia) is an Israeli non-governmental organization that aims to promote democracy, equality, and social justice. Founded in 2016, Tzedek Centers defines itself as a movement with an eye towards Israel's long-term democratic future through a combination of deep, grassroots work and shorter term, high impact initiatives. Organization reports that its 24 centers operate in 23 different cities, with more than 6,000 activists have directly reached over 300,000 citizens through training programs, community events and campaigns.

== History ==
=== Founding and early development ===
Tzedek Centers was established in 2016 and began its activities in the city of Rehovot before expanding to additional municipalities across Israel. The movement founder is Izhar Carmon, who currently serves as its chairperson. Organization established with the goal of strengthening Israeli democracy by fostering local leadership and civic engagement, as well as countering what its founders described as a growing sense of “learned political helplessness” among segments of the Israeli society.

=== Expansion ===
The organization has expanded from a single center to a national network. By 2026, it operated active centers in cities including Jerusalem, Tel Aviv, Haifa, Rishon LeZion, Bat Yam, Rehovot, Majd al-Krum, Tamra, Nazareth, Nahariya, Katzrin, Kiryat Shmona, Modi'in, Harish, Rosh Ha'Ayin, Ramla, Jaljulia, Beersheba, Ofakim, Netivot, Acre, Pardes Hanna-Karkur and Ashkelon.

Haifa is also a home for the Organization's first Russian speaking center.

Following the events of October 7, 2023, the organization expanded its reach to southern Israel, establishing its presence in cities such as Netivot, Ofakim, and Ashkelon to support communities affected by the conflict.

According to Ynet by the 2048 Tzedek Centers expects more than 50% of members of local and municipal councils in Israel would be alumnus of Organization's "Local Voice" program with share of women among them being more than 50%.

== Activities and Impact ==
Tzedek Centers focusing on municipal-level change as a foundation for national impact. Its core activities include:

Leadership training

The centers run training programs for local residents, providing them with tools for community organizing, political activism, and social entrepreneurship.

Action groups

Alumni and volunteers form groups that campaign on specific local and national issues, such as education, urban planning, gender equality, and environmental justice. As of 2022, approximately 50 such groups were active nationwide.

As stated in Haaretz Newspaper within a week after October 7 massacre "The Warm House" project was launched by two nongovernmental organizations: Tzedek Centers and the Israeli Friends of Ukraine (IFU). Project helped more than 150 families to find houses provided by volunteering families from other regions of Israel.

Shared society initiatives

The organization actively promotes partnership between Jewish and Arab citizens of Israel. This includes collaboration with Ajyal, an Arab youth movement, to foster dialogue and joint action on shared civil interests. According to Jerusalem Post Tzedek Centers and the Ajyal Movement work tirelessly to enhance community resilience, providing first-aid training, organizing local emergency response teams, and creating neighborhood-based emergency hubs. In Majd al-Krum and Tamra, for example, volunteers are being trained to provide rapid response in times of crisis, offering both physical and psychosocial support to their communities.

According to the Times of Israel after the October 7 massacre, the Abraham Initiatives partnered with Tzedek Centers and Givat Haviva established the Guardians of Partnership project in cities where both Arab and Jewish communities live side by side.

Municipal engagement

Movement encourages citizens to run for local office and participate in local councils to influence city policy directly.

== Organizational structure and funding ==
Tzedek Centers operates as a registered non-profit (Amuta) in Israel, often associated with the legal framework of the Hashomer Hatzair Graduates Movement (Tnuat HaBogrim).

The organization funded through a combination of sources, including:

- Philanthropic foundations: major donors include the New Israel Fund (NIF), the Russell Berrie Foundation, and the UJA-Federation of New York.
- Governmental and municipal partnerships: organization collaborates with local authorities on specific social welfare and educational projects. Tzedek Centers receives funding from the Israeli government and the municipalities it works with.
- Private donations: organization collects membership dues and individual donations from supporters in Israel and abroad.

Organization also receives funding from organizations such as Jewish National Fund, World Zionist Organization and the Zionist Council, as well as Social Venture Fund, Metrowest Federation; foundations including Gandyr Foundation, Havazelet Group, Friedrich Ebert Foundation, Heinrich Böll Foundation, Rayne Foundation; and private donations.

New centers are expected to reach a point, where 80% of their budget will be derived from local, self-generated or municipal and government funding rather than from philanthropy. According to the Tzedek Centers, its early established centers have already reached this threshold, which allows them to invest resources into the establishment of new centers.

== See also ==
- Ajyal
- Hashomer Hatzair
