= Ajyal (youth movement) =

Arab-Israeli youth movement

Ajyal - Arab Division of HaShomer HaTzair
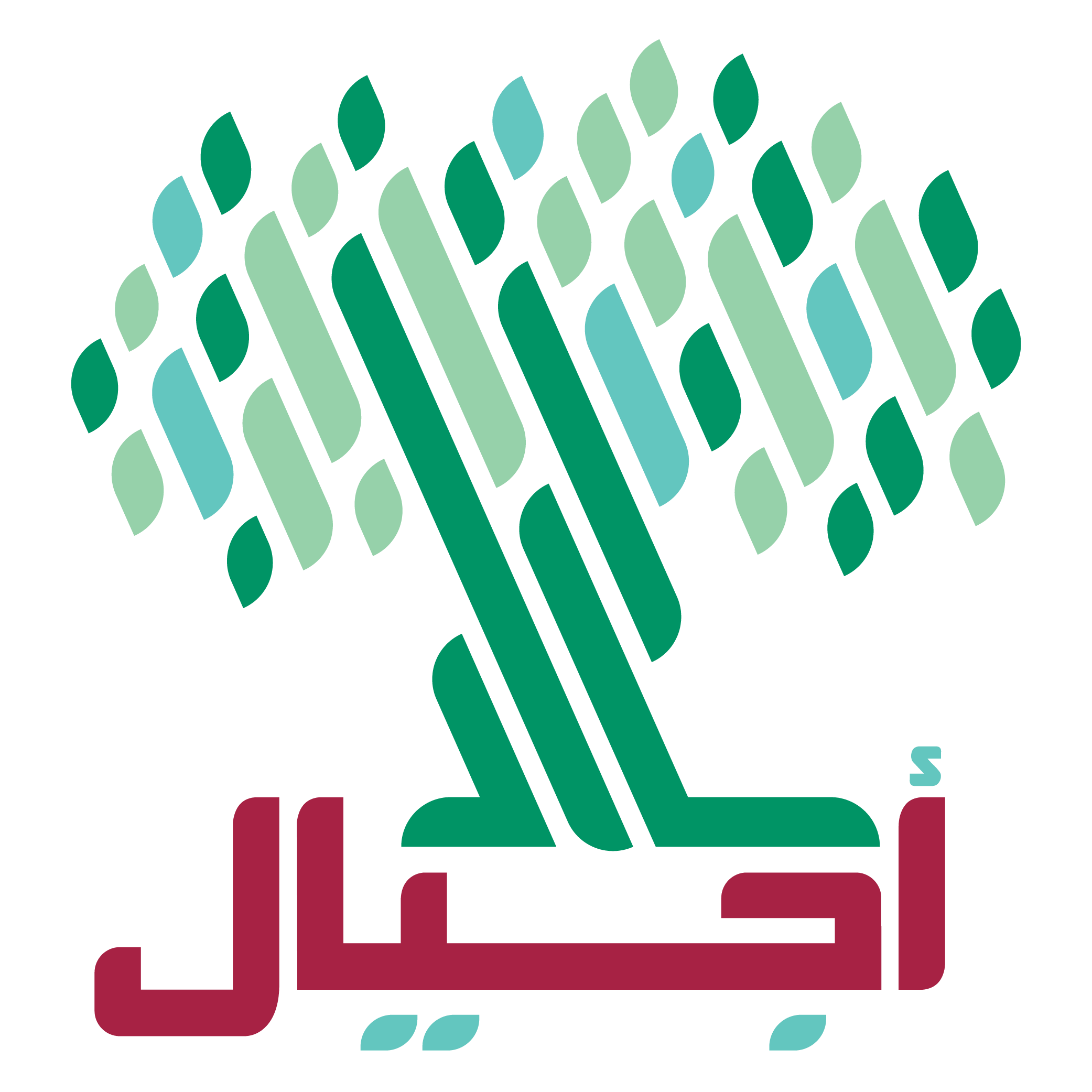
- Founded: 2006
- Type: Amutah in Israel
- Purpose: Socialism, Gender Equality, Peace, Democracy
- Location: Givat Haviva, Israel
- Origins: Democracy, Socialism, Scouting
- Region served: Israel
- Method: Informal education and Scouting
- Members: c. 7,000
- Affiliations: IFM – SEI
- Website: ajyal.org.il/the-ajyal-movement/

Ajyal (Arabic: أجيال - generations) is an Arab-Israeli youth movement, established in 2006, which exists as an autonomous division within HaShomer HaTzair.

== History ==
Ajyal Youth Movement was established as a continuation of the historic "Arabic Pioneer Youth" (he), which was established by Mapam in the beginning of the 1950s. As the military control over Arab-Israeli population (he) within the Green Line, the Movement gradually lost power, and by the 1980s it existed on a small scale as "The Arab Youth Movement". In 2004 it fell apart, and in 2006 there has been a shared decision to re-establish the movement as an autonomous division within HaShomer HaTzair, in order for there to exist a secular movement in the Arab sector in Israel.

In 2017 Ajyal has established, alongside its Jewish Israeli partner, a school for refugees of the Syrian civil war.

== Ideology ==
The Movement bases its pedagogy on the belief in humanity, and uses informal educational methods to spread its ideas. The Movement sees education as a means of social mobility, and a main way for personal development and the development of the Arab society in Israel.

The Movement chooses its ways of struggle in accordance with the needs of the society within which it exist, and its purpose is to develop a leadership to fight for social justice in Israel. Since the 2023 Hamas-led attack on Israel, Ajyal has create emergency aid in War struck communities in the Unrecognized Bedouin villages in Israel, and in the village of Arab al-Aramshe. The Movement also has 3 leadership institutions, which work as a "gap year" program for academic and social orientation for young Arab Israelis.

In 2010 the Movement participated in the HaShomer HaTzair's 17th National Conference (he), where Ajyal was re-introduced as HaShomer HaTzair's main partner with which a basis of dialogue between the Jewish and Arab in Israel will be created. The organization collaborates with Tzedek Centers, to foster dialogue and joint action on shared civil interests.

=== Social goals ===
- Developing the Palestinian identity of Arab citizens of Israel
- Social justice and democratic lifestyle
- Coexistence based upon peace, cooperation and mutual respect
- Nurturing young leadership for peace, humanism and solidarity of nations
- Gender equality and the development of the status of women in the Arab society
- Solidarity and struggle against crime in the Arab sector in Israel
- Volunteering and nurturing community work, innovation and entrepreneurship
- Guarding of nature and protection of the environment

== See also ==
- Hashomer Hatzair
- Tzedek Centers - an Israeli nonprofit organization founded by Hashomer Hatzair Life Movement (Tnuat HaBogrim)
