= Zahara Rubin =

Israeli artist (born 1932)

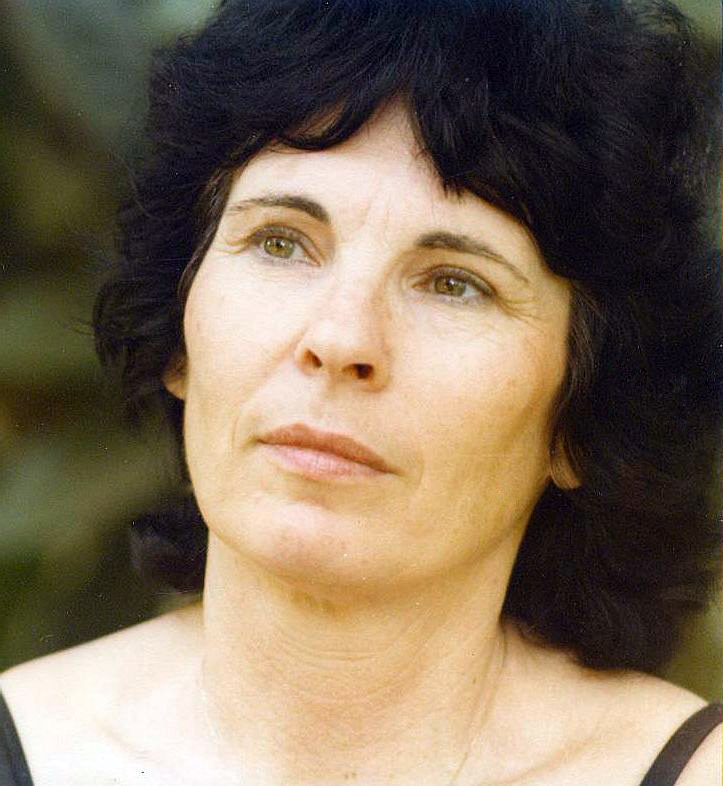

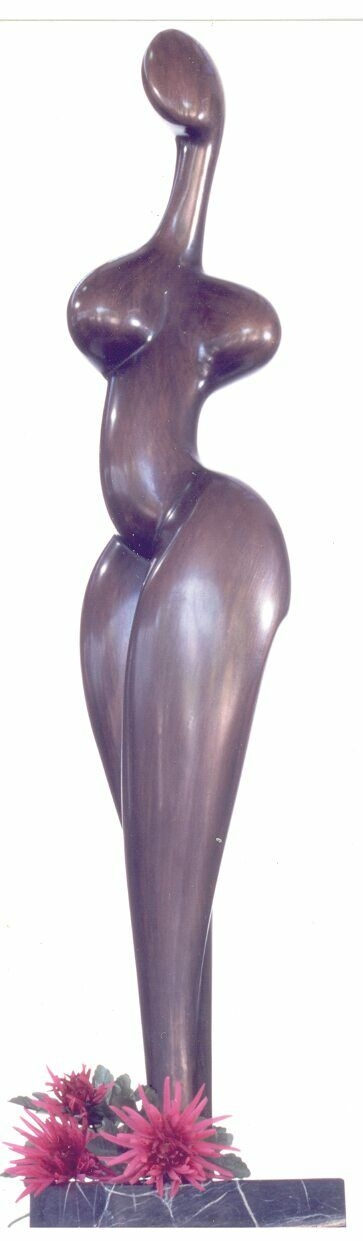
standing girl

Zahara Rubin (Hebrew: זהרה רובין; born 1932) is an Israeli sculptor, painter and artist.

== Early life and education ==
In 1950 Rubin graduated the Shomryia High-School in Kibbutz Mishmar HaEmek. She is a member of Kibbutz Bet Zera, in the Jordan Valley, where she lives and has her studio. As a mother of four and having worked in different sectors of the Kibbutz, she went to study sculpture with sculptor Yaakov Epstein, in the Plastic Arts Academy of Bat-Yam. A few years later she completed further studies with sculptor Dalia Mei'ri at Emek Yizrael College. During her career, she has received several Israeli art awards.

== Media ==
At present she uses a variety of formative arts methods to express herself, mainly bronze sculptures, as well as wood and marble sculptures, "Relief Painting", "Soft Painting" technique, wool tapestries and fantastic black painted creatures' images on natural white plywood boards.

== Career ==
Rubin is a member of the Israeli Union of Painters & Sculptors and the Kibbutz Movement's Artists Association; she had a number of solo exhibitions, participated in many groups exhibitions in Israel and other countries; her works can be found in many private collections worldwide. In April 1989, hotelier Leon Taman hosted the then Italian Prime Minister Ciriaco de Mita and his Minister of Foreign Affairs Giulio Andreotti at the Hotel Daniel and presented them with Rubin's sculpture Dove of Peace.

== Works ==
Rubin's bronze sculptures explore a variety of human issues, like adolescence, duality, femininity, fertility, parenthood, life in a rural area and worries-free childhood in Nature; from observation of natural processes and forms vis-a-vis their parallels in human life she created sculptures representing sprouting, growth, flowering, ripening, decay and continuity of life. Other series represent the erotic character common to Flora and humans. In recent years she tends to work on subjects like inter-human relationships, closeness and separation, oddities and socially acceptable, close by and far-away, giving artistic expression to accumulating emotions, transmission of sentiments and feelings between spouses, longings for relationship and love of the family.

Relief Painting is a kind of a flat sculpture. It is a unique technique, developed by Rubin, that uses various and different materials. With this technique she expresses, in a sensitive plastic forms, her feelings towards her surroundings. The contrasts between the artist and her human milieu create conflicts that, being stormy, hard and unsolved has a lot of influence on the forming of the work.

In Soft Painting - sheaves of colored fibers laid on a felt sheet replaces the brush and palette of the painter. Once the 'painting' is finished the combination of forms and colors is stapled to the sheet of felt with a special instrument. The results - big pictures, abstract in nature or of imaginary creatures in magic atmosphere – are rich in colors and forms.

== Awards ==
- 1972 – Education and Culture Ministers Prize for Arts Teachers
- 1976 - The Havatzelet Foundation for Sculptors
- 1977 - The Jordan Valley Regional Council's Prize for the Arts

== Selection of solo exhibitions ==
- 1972 – HaKibutz HaArtzi Building, Tel-Aviv
- 1976 – Wilfrid Israel Museum, HaZore'a
- 1979 – BookShop Gallery, London
- 1982 – Uri & Rami Nechushtan Museum, Ashdot-Ya'akov
- 1983 – Yad LaBanim Museum, Tiberias
- 1985 – Meisner Gallery, Hamburg, Germany
- 1987 – Tirosh Gallery, Tel Aviv
- 1991 – Culture Palace, Netanya
- 1992 – "The Tower", Tel Aviv
- 1994 – Engel Gallery, Tel Aviv
- 1996 – Moriya, Eilat
- 2003 – Culture Palace, Kfar Sava
- 2004 – Culture Palace, Kfar Sava
- 2009 – Castra, Haifa
- 2010 – The Scots Hotels' Gallery, St. Andrew's Glilee, Tiberias
- 2012 – Auditorium, Haifa
- 2012 – Karo Arts, Art Gallery, Haifa
- 2012 – The Gallery, Mishmar Ha'Emek

== Gallery ==
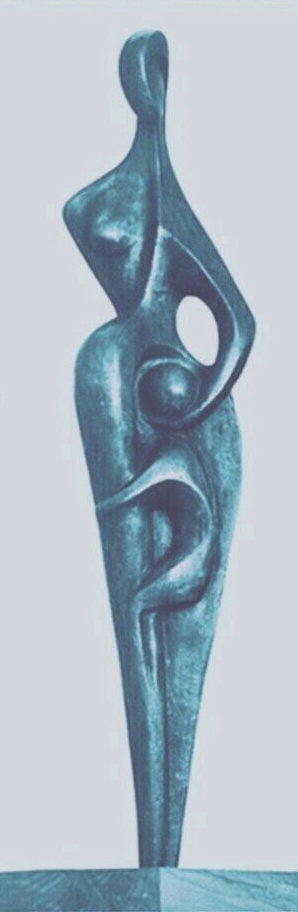
mom & son

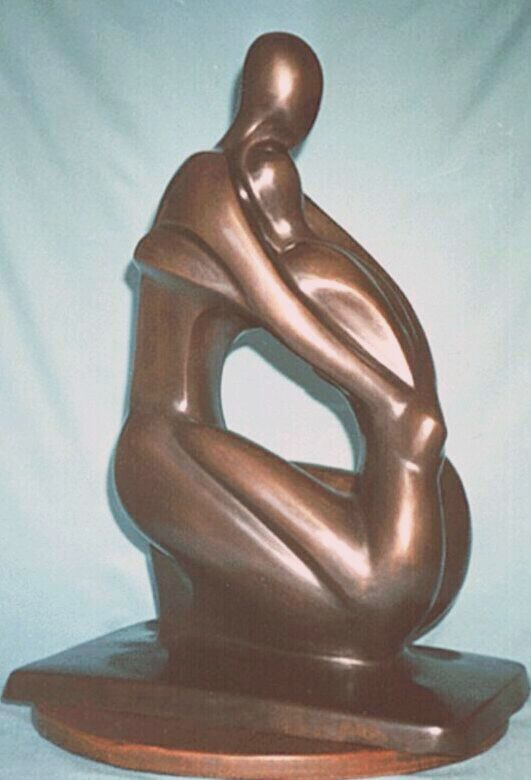
couple
